= Harborplace =

Shopping complex in downtown Baltimore, Maryland, U.S.

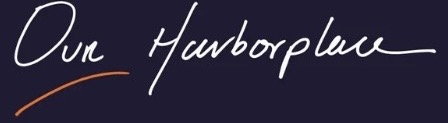

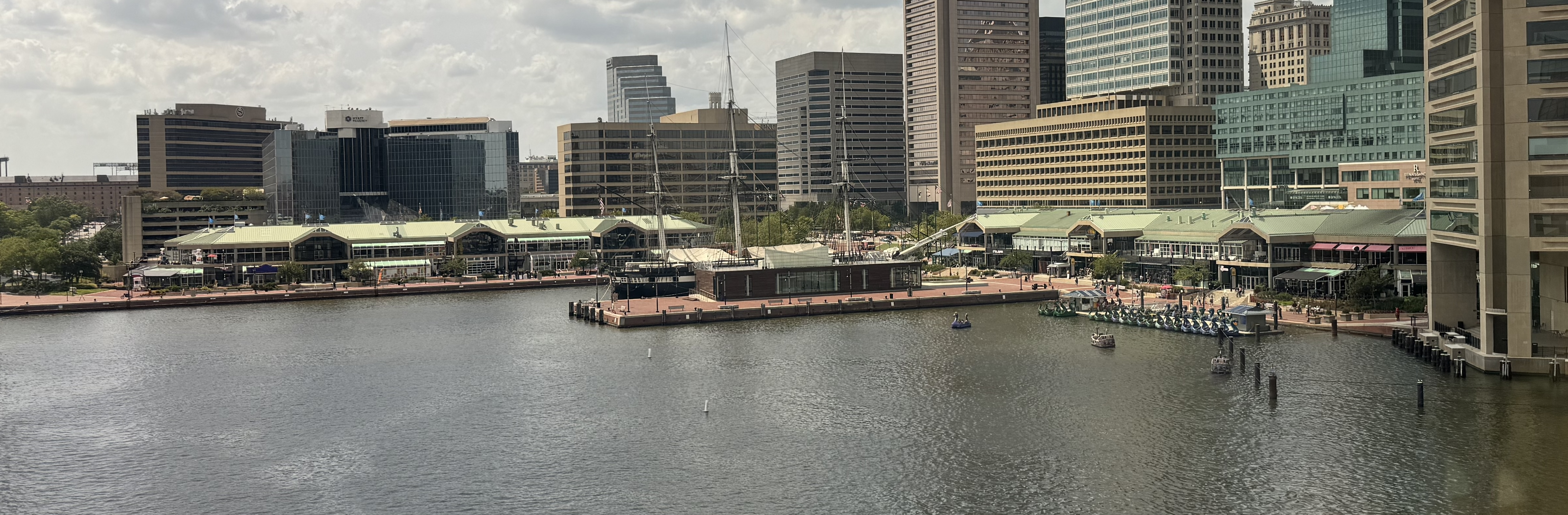
- Panoramic view from the National Aquarium of the Harborplace pavilions in August 2024
- Location: Baltimore, Maryland, United States
- Coordinates: 39°17′09″N 76°36′42″W
- Address: 201 E. Pratt Street, 21202; 301 S. Light Street, 21202
- Opened: July 2, 1980; 46 years ago
- Renovated: 1998; 2011–2012; 2015–2018 (failed; partially completed)
- Previous names: Harborplace & The Gallery (1987–2012)
- Developer: The Rouse Company
- Manager: MCB Real Estate
- Owner: MCB Real Estate (Harborplace pavilions); City of Baltimore (land)
- Architect: Benjamin Thompson & Associates, Inc.
- Num. of stores: 135 (at peak; 27 remaining)
- Floor area: 117,083 square feet (11,000 m^{2})
- Floors: 2 in both pavilions (with one basement level; Second level is restricted in the Light Street Pavilion)
- Parking: Parking garage at The Gallery / Paid parking
- Public transit: at Charles Center or Shot Tower; BaltimoreLink routes 54, 63, 65, 71, 154, CityLink Brown, CityLink Navy, CityLink Orange, CityLink Purple, CityLink Yellow; Charm City Circulator Banner, Purple, and Orange routes; Baltimore Water Taxi
- Building details
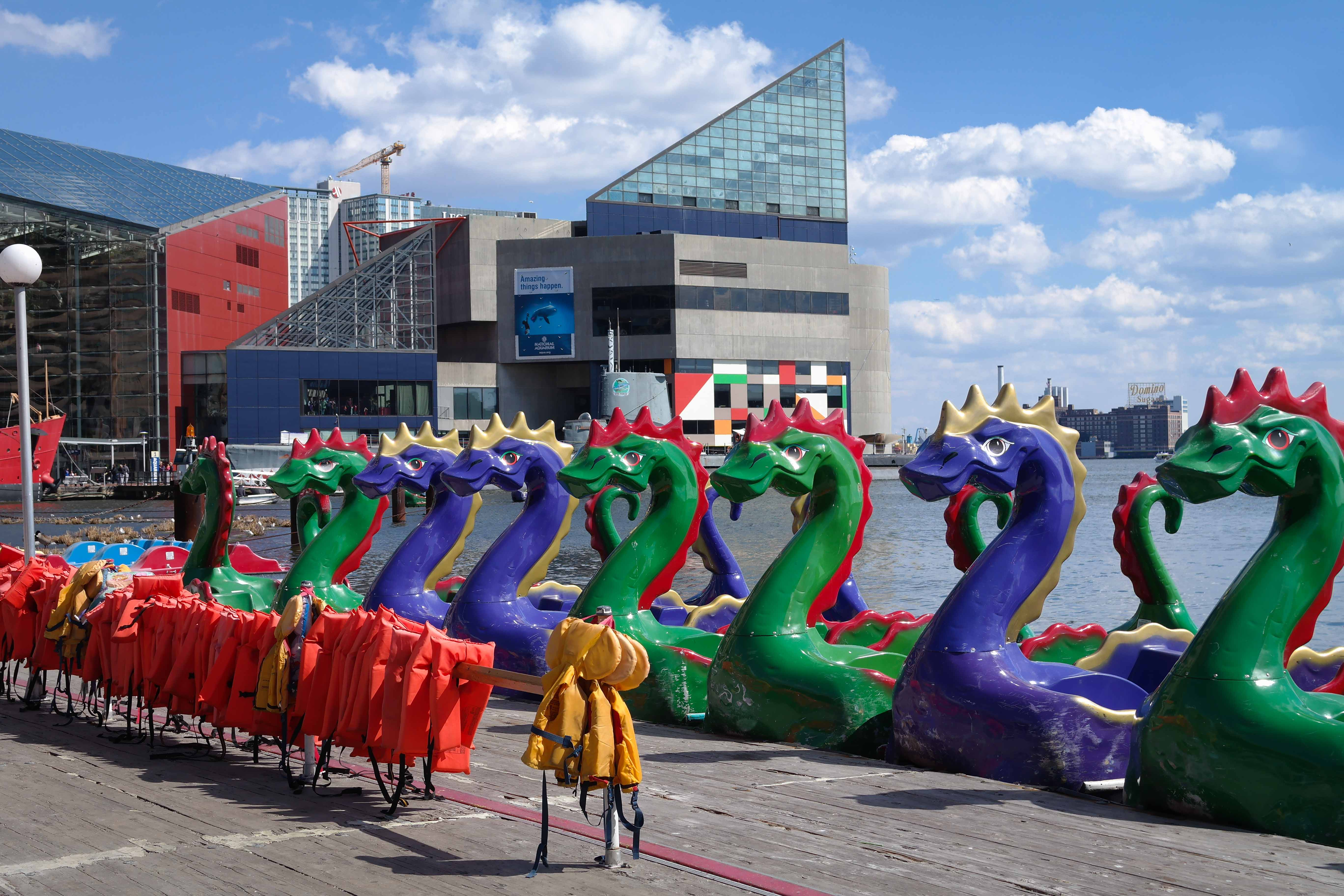
- Dragon pedal boats at the complex's waterfront, nearby Harborplace (April 3, 2015)

General information
- Status: Scheduled for redevelopment (demolition delayed)
- Type: Festival marketplace (1980–2012); Shopping mall (2012–present)
- Construction started: January 1979; 47 years ago
- Completed: 1980

Design and construction
- Main contractor: Whiting-Turner Construction Company

Renovating team
- Architect: MG2 (2015–2018)
- Renovating firm: The Rouse Co. (1998); General Growth Properties (2011–2012); Ashkenazy Acquisition Corporation Realty (2015–2018)

Website
- www.ourharborplace.com

Harborplace is a largely vacant shopping mall and restaurant complex at the Inner Harbor in downtown Baltimore, Maryland, composed of three retail structures: the Pratt Street Pavilion, the Light Street Pavilion, and The Gallery at Harborplace, all of which were developed by the Rouse Company of Columbia, Maryland. Other adjacent structures include an office tower on 111 S. Calvert Street known as Harborplace Tower, and the Renaissance Baltimore Harborplace Hotel, both adjacent to the Gallery mall, which remains closed as of January 2022.

Harborplace was originally designed as a festival marketplace, featuring hundreds of local vendors and eateries and attracting multiple tourists throughout the 1980s, making it a flagship for James W. Rouse after previously developing Faneuil Hall Marketplace in Downtown Boston, Massachusetts. Throughout the 1990s, national chains began taking over the pavilions, and by the early 2010s, Harborplace featured traditional tenants typically found in suburban malls, such as Bubba Gump Shrimp Co., Ripley's Believe It or Not!, The Cheesecake Factory, Five Guys, and Hooters, leading to the complex to be perceived as a tourist trap.

General Growth Properties (GGP) sold Harborplace to Ashkenazy Acquisition Corporation (AAC) in November 2012, which allowed the pavilions to deteriorate through a lack of basic repairs and maintenance. Ashkenazy defaulted on its loan on the property, and they lost control when it went into court-ordered receivership in March 2019. Problems were exacerbated by the COVID-19 pandemic in the early 2020s, with popular chains, including Noodles & Co., M&S Grill, McCormick World of Flavors, Banana Republic, H&M, and Uno Pizzeria & Grill leaving, leading to Harborplace becoming a dead mall.

The Gallery at Harborplace, separately owned and managed by BGRE (formerly Brookfield Properties) closed permanently in January 2022. In April to December of that year, the pavilions were acquired by MCB Real Estate, which had plans to demolish the facility in the fall of 2026 and replace it with a mixed-use development that is expected to be completed by the early 2030s. However, on September 17, 2026, that plan was delayed, meaning the pavilions will stay open until further notice. To keep Harborplace active while redevelopment plans are being finalized, Downtown Partnership of Baltimore's BOOST/LTP program allowed local businesses to open inside them, such as Soul Kuisine Cafe in the former Gump on the Run space, and Made in Baltimore, partially replacing H&M. Security concerns from crime in the surrounding area, and the rise of e-commerce has also made Harborplace's viability as a retail center struggle irrevocably.

== Overview ==
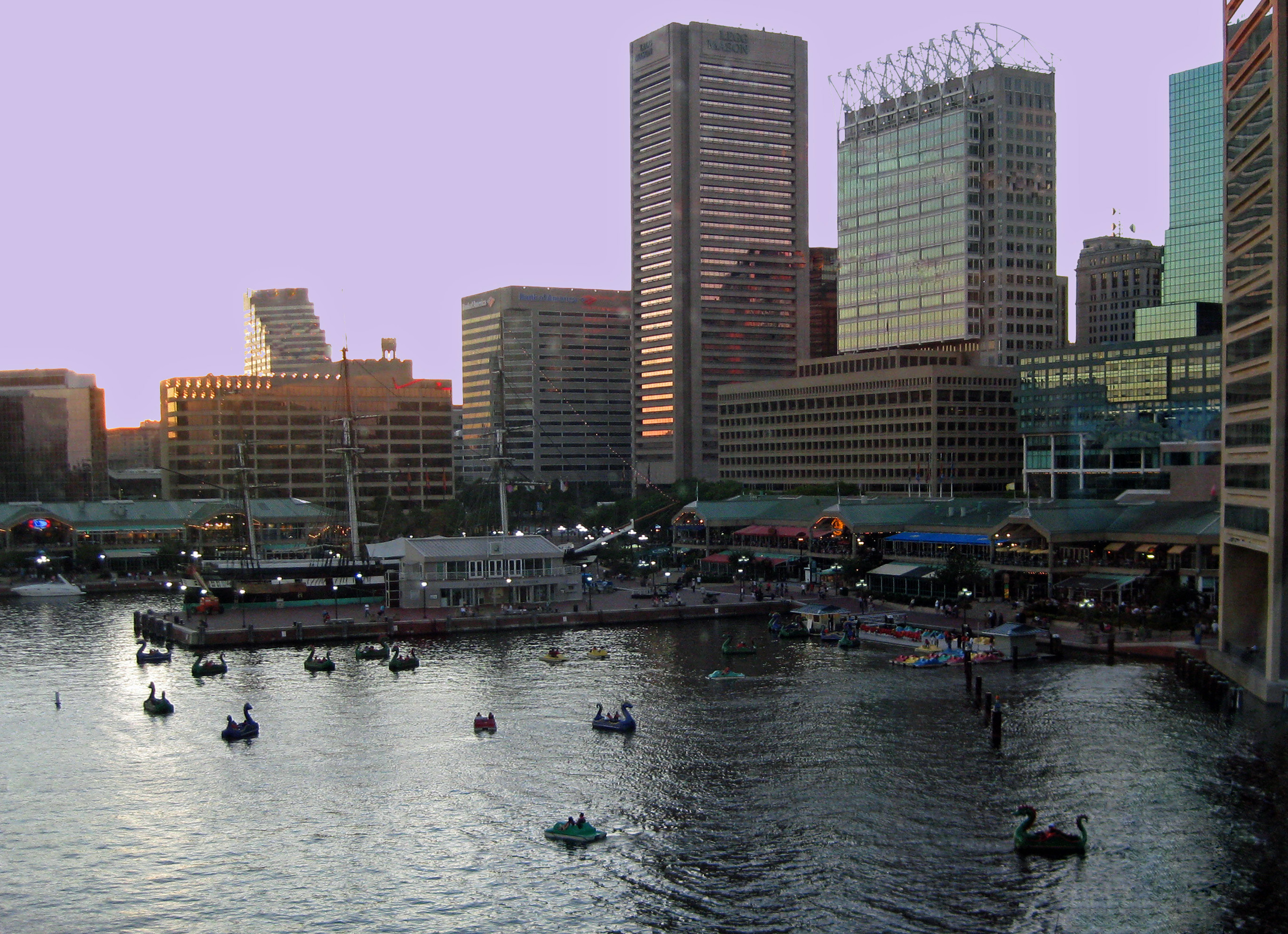
A view of the complex in February 2009 at sunset

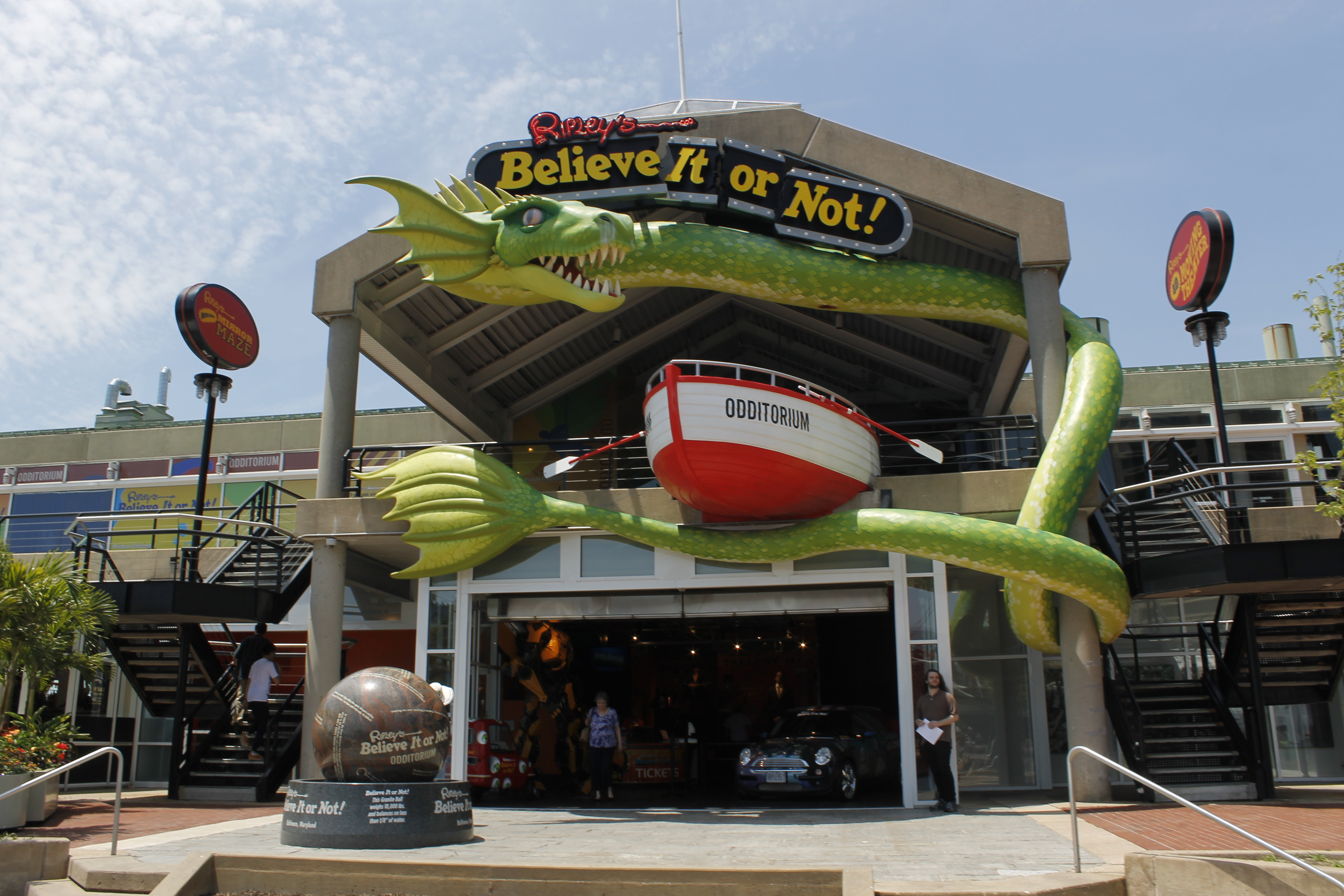
Chessie, a green sea monster, greeted visitors into the Ripley's Believe It or Not! Odditorium until the attraction's closure in May 2020.

The property consists of two, green metal-roofed shopping mall pavilions, each two stories in height; one along Pratt Street, the other on Light Street, (hence the colloquial names "Twin Pavilions" and "Sister Pavilions"). In between the pavilions is an open-air amphitheater known as the Inner Harbor Amphitheater Outdoor Stage for community gathering events, such as Fleet Week. There is also a five-story mall adjacent to the Pratt Street Pavilion called The Gallery at Harborplace that has been closed and vacant since January 2022. Where the defunct Gallery mall is includes a 28-story office tower known as Harborplace Tower, and a 12-story Renaissance hotel, formerly a Stouffer hotel.

The pavilions housed a range of stores and restaurants, some of which once sold merchandise specific to Baltimore or the state of Maryland, such as blue crab food products, Baltimore Orioles and Baltimore Ravens merchandise, Edgar Allan Poe products, and University of Maryland Terrapins clothing. Portions of the interior of both pavilions would have waffle slab ceilings, and were designed to resemble historical market sheds, both having second-floor balconies. The Harborplace complex used to be a bustling tourist attraction.

== History ==
=== 1964–1980: Planning and construction ===
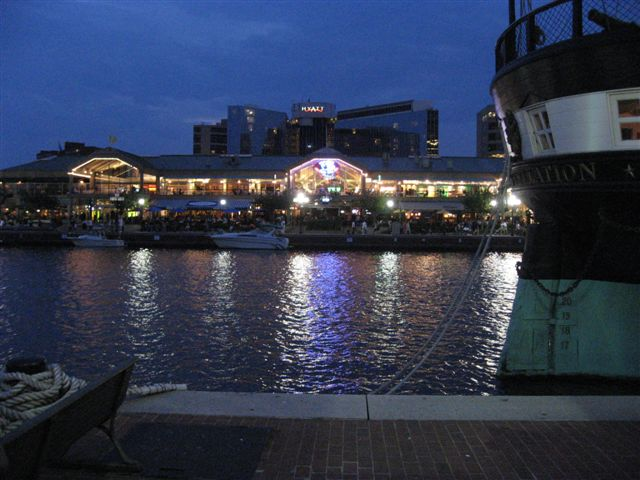
Harborplace at night in May 2008

In September 1964, in response to post-World War II suburbanization, then-Baltimore mayor Theodore Roosevelt McKeldin, in collaboration with the Philadelphia, Pennsylvania-based architect Wallace McHarg Roberts & Todd (WMRT) initiated the first Inner Harbor Master Plan to clear out derelict piers and industrial warehouses, as downtown Baltimore has struggled, being largely neglected. Those warehouses have since been razed and replaced with mixed-use buildings, including the Baltimore Convention Center, which opened in 1979. The Maryland Science Center was completed and opened to the public in June 1976, with the Baltimore World Trade Center (BWTC) being completed in January 1977. That year, then-Baltimore mayor William Donald Schaefer hired the Columbia, Maryland-based urban planner James W. Rouse, who also developed West Baltimore's Mondawmin Mall and known for Faneuil Hall Marketplace in Boston, Massachusetts, to create a similar vibrant commercial hub, following his most recent major completion in Philadelphia, being The Gallery at Market East. The concept chosen for the Inner Harbor project would be a festival marketplace, the same one used for Faneuil Hall Marketplace, which was a lively, European-style public space with locally owned restaurants, diverse small vendors and entertainment, including nightlife.

In 1978, because the land was owned by the city and was in an area designated as a park in the city charter, a citywide referendum was required to proceed with the project, championed by William D. Schaefer. The amendment "limited the size of any project there to the top of the USS Constellation docked in front of the Pratt Street Pavilion." Voters approved the use of 3.2 acres (1.3 ha) of public parkland for the development, provided the surrounding 26 acres (11 ha) remained public open space. The Inner Harbor promenade where Harborplace now sits was completed in April 1974. Rouse then partnered with Phillips Foods, Inc. and Seafood Restaurants, convincing the family that for Harborplace to be successful, the pavilions needed to include Phillips Seafood, following its previous concerns regarding the Inner Harbor's dilapidated state. Manager Steve Phillips approved of the idea, and signed a 20-year lease to operate a flagship restaurant at the Light Street Pavilion.

The Rouse Company announced Harborplace in November 1978, and the project was estimated to cost around $20 million. To proceed with the project, the Rouse Co. founded the Maryland-based subsidiary Harborplace, Inc. The Massachusetts-based architectural firm Benjamin C. Thompson was hired to design the Harborplace pavilions, and the marketplace officially began construction in January 1979 on the former site of the Baltimore Steam Packet Company docks. Developer Martin Millspaugh gave James Rouse an offer to power Harborplace with the Pratt Street Power Plant, which, at the time, sat abandoned. Rouse rejected this, arguing that he wanted Harborplace to be "entirely first-class," and didn't want "any chance of the power failing."

=== 1980–1990: Grand opening and early years ===
Original logo (1980–2012)

Following James Rouse's retirement from the Rouse Company in 1979, Mathias J. DeVito was at Harborplace's grand opening, though James Rouse stood alongside William D. Schaefer to cut the ribbon. Harborplace had its grand opening celebration on July 2, 1980, as a centerpiece of the revival of downtown Baltimore. The event was a week-long celebration that lasted until July 6, 1980, but most of the events and festivals happened on July 2, 1980. The event attracted over 200,000 attendees and involved a ribbon-cutting ceremony, speeches by James Rouse, Mathias DeVito and William Schaefer, a releasing of balloons into the sky, and was filled with music from various groups, including multiple Scottish bagpipe bands that paraded through the area. The Baltimore Symphony Orchestra performed a live concert at the water's edge. The event concluded at sunset with Tchaikovsky's 1812 Overture, accompanied by firing cannons and a major fireworks display. James Rouse then declared Harborplace as the "official playground of the Inner Harbor for all ages." Harborplace was so successful that it attracted nearly 18 million visitors–more visitors than Walt Disney World–in its first few years, and also led to a Time magazine published on August 24, 1981, titled "Living: He Digs Downtown" with James Rouse on the cover with the phrase "Cities Are Fun!"

The twin pavilions were filled with multiple local specialty shops and restaurants. The Pratt Street Pavilion was a retail and dining-based mall, while the Light Street Pavilion included a second-floor food court known as the Light Street Food Hall, and a ground-floor marketplace known as the Sam Smith Market. The Light Street Pavilion was the larger sister mall of the Pratt Street Pavilion, with significantly more room for stores and restaurants. Notable original tenants included City Lights Seafood, an 870-seat Phillips Seafood (operating as Phillips Harborplace), Lee's Ice Cream, Hats in the Belfry, and Athenian Plaka. Phillips Seafood also included the Phillips Harborplace Express, a carry-out restaurant, and the Phillips Seafood Buffet, an "all you can eat" restaurant. The Inner Harbor Amphitheater Outdoor Stage was in between the pavilions to allow for events such as concerts and community gatherings, and the layout of the entire waterfront complex would be L-shaped.

Baltimore's Harborplace Festival Marketplace became an "architectural prototype, despite opening several years after Quincy Market," attracting both local residents and out-of-town visitors, and spawning a series of other similar urban renewal projects by the Rouse Co.: Waterside Festival Marketplace in Norfolk, Virginia, Portside Festival Marketplace in Toledo, Ohio, and even non-waterfront projects like Owings Mills Mall in Owings Mills, Maryland, The Gallery at Market East's Gallery II expansion in Philadelphia, Pennsylvania, and 6th Street Marketplace in Richmond, Virginia. In its heyday, it also outperformed the then-failing Broadway Market.

Harborplace's success was amplified by the August 1981 opening of the National Aquarium and the 1982 opening of McKeldin Fountain, drawing more traffic. Following the 1982 opening of McKeldin Fountain, The Rouse Co. added an additional skywalk to the Light Street Pavilion connecting the mall to the fountain in 1982. Harborplace was successful enough that James Rouse founded the non-profit Enterprise Foundation in 1982, which in turn created the for-profit subsidiary Enterprise Development Company (EDC), specifically to bring the festival marketplace concept to smaller cities.

The Fudgery, a local fudge shop where the employees would sing and perform while making fudge to entertain guests, opened in 1985 in the Light Street Pavilion. The Rouse Company also developed The Gallery at Harborplace, connected to the Pratt Street Pavilion, and it opened in September 1987. This led to the Harborplace complex having three malls. The Stouffer Harborplace Hotel (now Renaissance Baltimore Harborplace Hotel) was built adjacent to The Gallery and the Harborplace Tower and opened in April 1988. The success of this addition led to the Rouse Co. to collectively refer to the complex as "Harborplace & The Gallery."

=== 1990–2003: Coca-Cola and new tenant mix ===
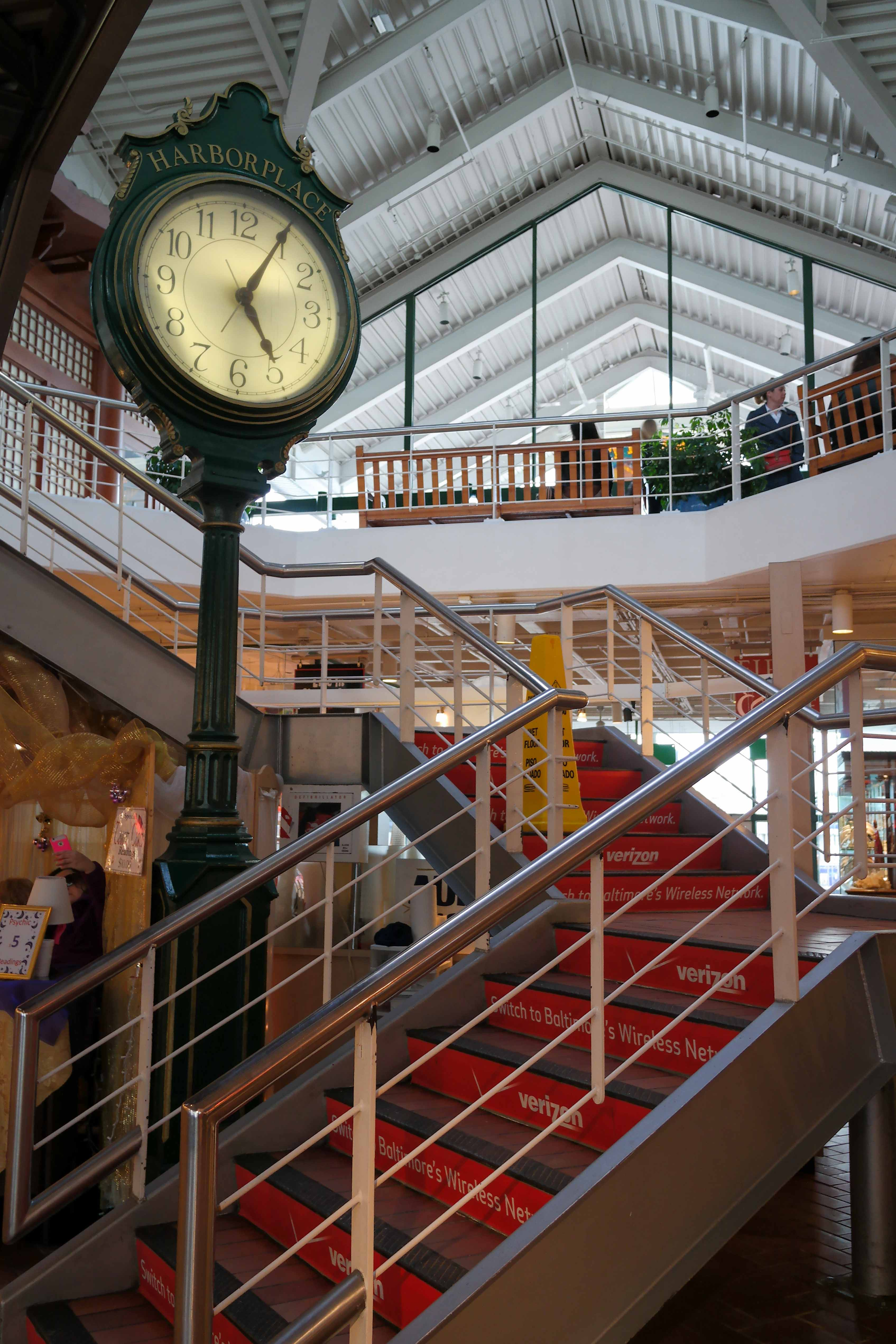
Pratt Street Pavilion (April 3, 2015)

Harborplace celebrated its 10th anniversary on July 2, 1990, with the Rouse Company sponsoring The Coca-Cola Company as part of the celebration. As part of its official anniversary sponsorship, Coca-Cola manufactured thousands of commemorative plastic souvenir cups, distributed to all the Inner Harbor merchants who sold Coke products to use throughout the anniversary week. One side of the cup featured the official Harborplace 10th Anniversary logo, while the other side detailed that a portion of the drink proceeds would be donated directly to Baltimore Reads Inc., which was the hallmark city literacy initiative created by Baltimore's mayor at the time.

A famous error occurred during designing the cups. In the small print credits on the cup, the Coca-Cola print shop accidentally misspelled legendary Baltimore Mayor Kurt L. Schmoke's name; the cups read "Kurt L. Schnoke" instead of "Schmoke". This typo became an instant local joke, where when Mayor Schmoke arrived at the Light Street Pavilion to kick off the 10th-anniversary festivities on July 1, 1990, reporters asked him about it. He famously laughed it off, joking to The Washington Post that he guessed he would "just have to stay around for another 10 years and see that they get it right next time." Because of the error, those Coca-Cola 10th-anniversary cups quickly became collector's items for locals.

Starting in the 1990s, The Rouse Co. began shifting from local vendors to chain stores at Harborplace for financial reasons, refusing to renew leases for several businesses. The first national tenant to open in Harborplace was Hooters, which opened in October 1990, and shortly received accusations of gender discrimination. The Baltimore Sun reported on January 25, 1991, that 13 of Harborplace & The Gallery's 200 businesses had moved out, with Gordon's Booksellers shuttering on that day as it was an unprofitable location in comparison to their 8 E. Baltimore Street location. Johnny Rockets would open in March of that year. Pronto Ristorante closed permanently due to poor reviews, leading to Rouse to immediately take it over and replace it with several other Italian establishments and reconfigurations that failed until Pizzeria Uno (later Uno Chicago Grill) opened on the second floor of the Pratt Street Pavilion sometime in June 1991 utilizing that space. In May 1992, The Nature Co. announced an expansion of its Harborplace store. The Tandoor restaurant closed its Harborplace location in October of that year due to declining business, and that the Rouse Co. didn't extend its lease. The opening of Oriole Park at Camden Yards on April 6, 1992, led to visitors moving from Harborplace to the new stadium.

The Cheesecake Factory announced in 1995 that it was going to open in the Pratt Street Pavilion. The tenant had its grand opening in September 1996, replacing Nickel City Grill. Earlier that year, original restaurant American Cafe closed to relocate to the BWI Airport, and their former space at the Light Street Pavilion eventually became an expanded portion of the existing Hooters. J. Paul's Dining Saloon opened on the first floor of the Light Street Pavilion on November 16, 1997. In January 1998, Will Smith and Jada Pinkett Smith broke ground for a Planet Hollywood restaurant at the Pratt Street Pavilion. Impressed by the successful transformation of the Pratt Street Power Plant by local firm The Cordish Companies, which added Hard Rock Cafe, Barnes & Noble, and ESPN Zone, The Rouse Company launched an extensive, $13 million "remerchandising and modernization" program for Harborplace in March 1998, phasing out smaller mom-and-pop craft vendors, and signing leases with national tenants to open in their places. Planet Hollywood closed permanently on September 13, 2001, due to poor performance, which exacerbated after the 9/11 attacks. The vacant space was replaced with M&S Grill, a restaurant operated by McCormick & Schmick's, in October 2003.

Harborplace celebrated its 20th anniversary on July 2, 2000, marking two complete decades in operation. Then-Mayor Martin J. O'Malley and local dignitaries ceremonially cut an enormous custom birthday cake shared with thousands of visitors, and the Inner Harbor hosted high-profile outdoor performances, including a live concert by Davy Jones (of The Monkees) and local classic rock favorites The Ravyns. The night concluded with a massive synchronized fireworks display over the water, and unbeknownst to the crowds eating birthday cake, this would be the final major anniversary celebrated under the Rouse Company.

After its original lease concluded, Phillips Seafood resigned a massive 20-year lease extension with the Rouse Company on March 14, 2000, following a massive $5 million renovation project that brought the climate-controlled greenhouse patio seating and the classic boathouse bar to the Light Street Pavilion, which started sometime in 1997 and was completed in December 2000.

=== 2004–2012: General Growth Properties (GGP) ===
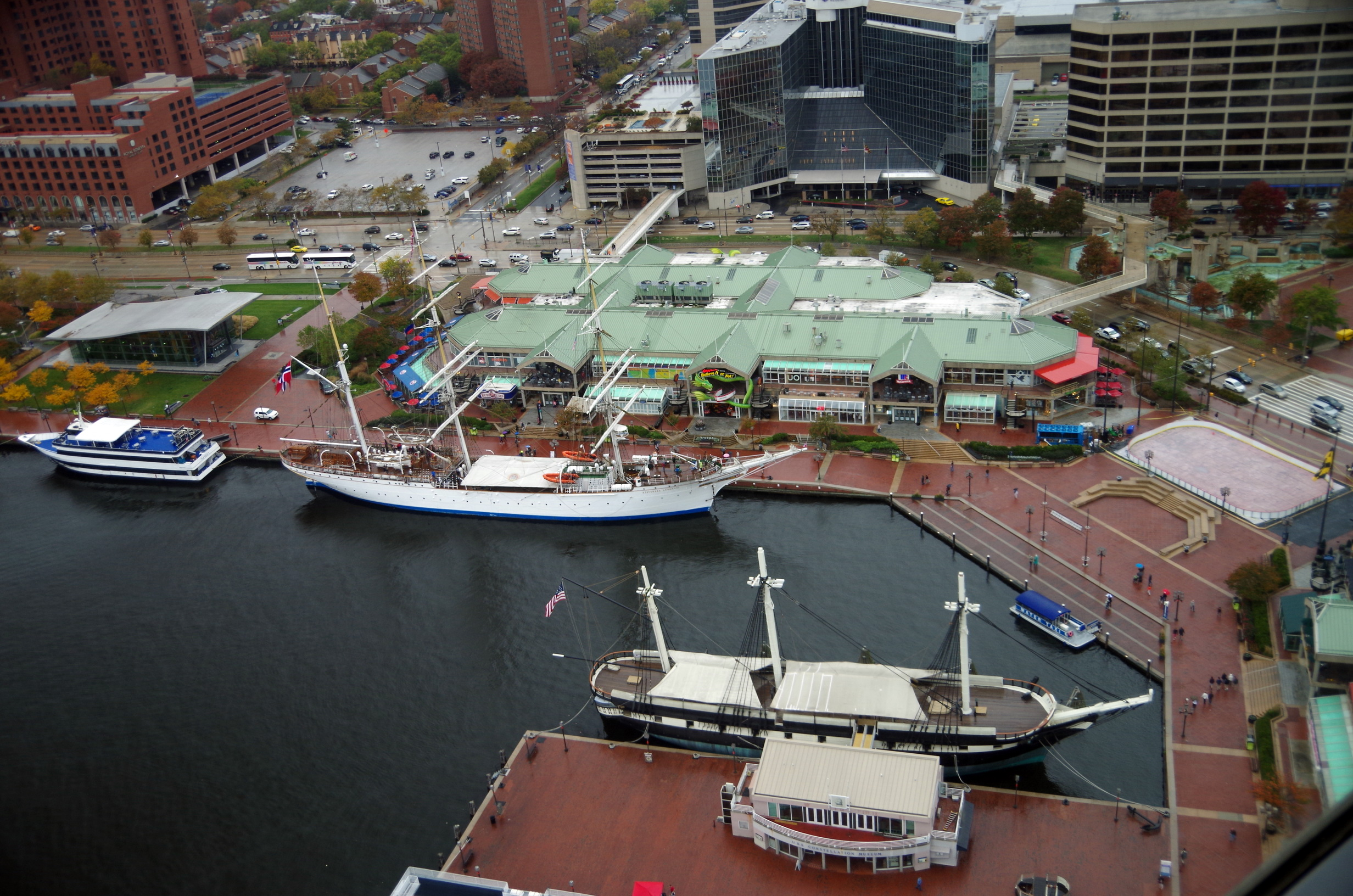
Light Street Pavilion as viewed from the Baltimore World Trade Center, also featuring the Baltimore Visitor Center (left) and the USS Constellation (November 7, 2015)

On May 7, 2004, the Baltimore Visitor Center opened, situated adjacent to the Light Street Pavilion and the Maryland Science Center. The Chicago, Illinois-based General Growth Properties (GGP) acquired the Rouse Company's portfolio, including both Harborplace and The Gallery, in November 2004 as part of its $12.6 billion acquisition of the company. Following this, GGP announced in late March 2005 that Five Guys, Edo Sushi, Irish pub Tir na nÓg, and the UK-based Spanish tapas restaurant La Tasca would open at Harborplace.

On the weekend of July 1, 2005, Harborplace celebrated its 25th anniversary with a ceremony featuring Maryland Governor Robert L. Ehrlich, Martin O'Malley, and Baltimore Area Convention & Visitors Association (BACVA) president Leslie R. Doggett, making this the complex's first birthday under GGP. Local artist Bob Hallett provided live music at the amphitheater, accompanying regional performers who specialized in classic, old-school Baltimore styling, and the musical entertainment featured a massive dance celebration with the city's iconic "Original Bawlmer Hons," being local women dressed in 1960s-style beehive hairdos, cat-eye glasses, and leopard print, celebrating the city's distinct culture. The anniversary weekend doubled as a massive public audition and showcase for the Inner Harbor's famous street jugglers, acrobats, and fire-eaters. Starbucks closed its doors in the Light Street Pavilion on December 31, 2008, because of financial problems and store cannibalization, which forced the company to undergo a nationwide restructuring beginning in July 2008 during the Great Recession. The restructuring involved closing 600 underperforming cafes nationwide that were not making a profit, which included 12 Maryland cafes, one of which was the Harborplace location. Starbucks relocated to the Gallery at Harborplace. La Tasca's opening was delayed to March 2006, featuring a two-story location at the Pratt Street Pavilion.

On April 16, 2009, GGP filed for Chapter 11 bankruptcy protection. It was one of the largest U.S. real estate failures at the time. A 7-foot-2-inch bronze statue of former Mayor and Governor William D. Schaefer was unveiled in October 2009, located just south of the Light Street Pavilion to honor his role in the harbor's creation. Simon Property Group attempted to acquire Harborplace and The Gallery in 2009, along with other GGP malls, and in February through April 2010, Simon also attempted a hostile $10 billion bid of GGP, but the deal failed when Brookfield Asset Management already obtained GGP a $6.8 billion equity recapitalization.

A 13,500 sq ft (1,250 m^{2}), two-story Urban Outfitters opened at the Light Street Pavilion in the spring of 2007, occupying the former City Lights Seafood space and a portion of the Discovery Channel Store. Senior marketing manager Carmel Gambacorta also announced that Capital Restaurant Concepts Ltd. would reopen the Paolo's restaurant once renovations were completed. Harborplace celebrated its 30th anniversary on the weekend of July 1, 2010, featuring an outdoor performance by The Fudgery, alongside 80s tribute band The Reagan Years. Then-Mayor Stephanie Rawlings-Blake used the celebration to heavily market the space, boosting security and adding over 100 cameras to ensure the event remained a safe, family-friendly environment, and a giant, iconic blue crab sculpture was commissioned and displayed at the Inner Harbor specifically to commemorate three decades in business. The event kicked off with confetti drops, a massive crab cake eating competition sponsored by Phillips Seafood, and fashion shows. This would be the last major birthday celebration at Harborplace, and the last one done under GGP.

==== 2011–2012 renovation ====
On October 1, 2010, Harborplace lost the original Johnny Rockets due to declining sales, alongside Brown Sugar Southern BBQ, Gourmet Chicken, and Thai Noodle Bowl, which were denied lease renewals by GGP to fit in the new 18,000-square-foot (1,700 m^{2}) H&M that they were trying to secure at the time. Around that year, GGP announced plans to bring new retail and eateries to Harborplace to better appeal to nearby residents and office workers, as well as tourists and convention attendees.

The two-story H&M opened at the Light Street Pavilion on May 19, 2011 in the former Discovery Channel Store space. IT'SUGAR opened a 3,100 sq ft (290 m^{2}) candy store on the first floor of the Pratt Street Pavilion in August 2011, and Noodles & Co. also opened that year. On September 30, 2011, Phillips Seafood, the last original tenant in the pavilions, permanently closed their location at the Light Street Pavilion because the restaurant announced that it was relocating to the former ESPN Zone space in the Pratt Street Power Plant. A Bubba Gump Shrimp Co. restaurant, based on the 1994 movie Forrest Gump, would open in the former Phillips Seafood space in the Light Street Pavilion in May 2012, while its Gump on the Run carry-out restaurant moved into the former Phillips Harborplace Express space. Bubba Gump was originally going to open a location in Baltimore in 1998 after negotiations with the Cordish Cos., but the proposal was abandoned after complaints from the National Aquarium about its location.

On February 28, 2012, GGP detailed that the renovations to Harborplace would include a new, 6,300-square-foot (590 m^{2}) food court on the first floor of the Light Street Pavilion known as The Galley, with an exterior entrance and four new eateries, being Subway, China Max, a revamped Johnny Rockets, and Chicken Now, with an overhauled dining area and a supporting bike rail being constructed by the city. As part of these renovations, a Ripley's Believe It or Not! Odditorium museum opened in the Light Street Pavilion on June 26, 2012, and took over the Light Street Food Hall, and two floors of what had been small, localized mom-and-pop stores. The museum featured a large, green sea monster wrapped around the Light Street Pavilion's exterior pillars known as Chessie, which critics considered "tacky" for the Inner Harbor and did not align with James Rouse's original vision. Harborplace in general became a tourist trap. Building the museum required GGP and Skarda and Associates, Inc. to add new stairs and a two-story elevator, alongside modifying structural portions of the mall to fit the 4D Moving Theater and Marvelous! Mirror Maze. In late 2011, J. Paul's closed temporarily to undergo a renovation, with a modern family-friendly cafe, an expanded bar and updated interior seating, which debuted in the summer of 2012. McCormick World of Flavors opened at the Light Street Pavilion in August of that year.

=== 2012–2023: Renovations, neglect, and decline ===
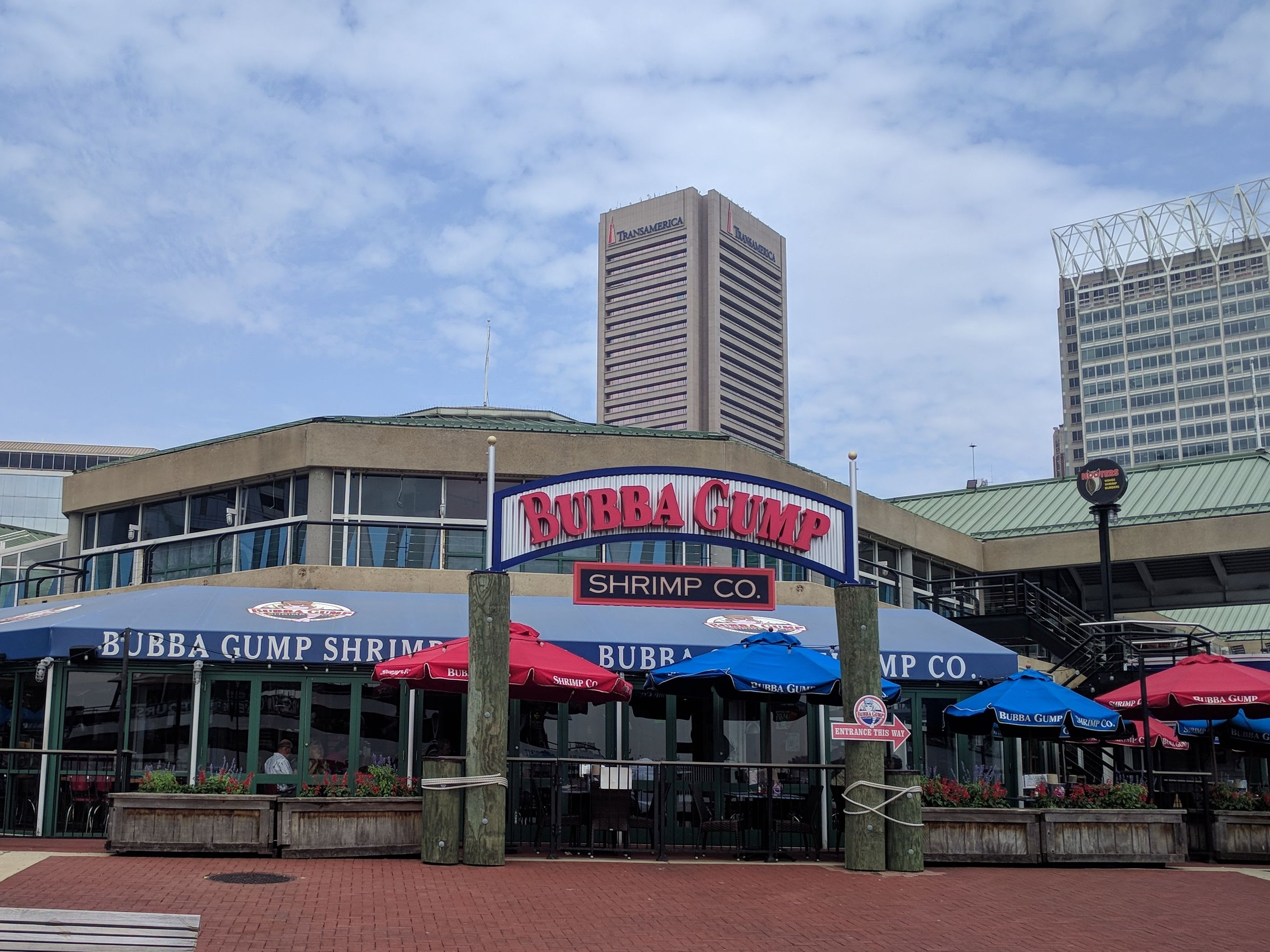
Bubba Gump (August 2018)

After emerging from bankruptcy, GGP sold assets it deemed were "non-core," including the Harborplace pavilions. In November 2012, the pavilions were sold to the New York-based Ashkenazy Acquisition Corporation for $100 million. (Note: Some sources cite 2013 and 2014 dates for the acquisition.) Since Ashkenazy only owned the pavilions but GGP retained ownership of the Gallery, the area was no longer referred to by either developer as "Harborplace & The Gallery." J. Paul's Dining Saloon closed permanently in October 2014, and it was announced on December 8, 2015, that Yard House would open in the former spot left by J. Paul's; however, as of January 2016, the restaurant never opened. In August 2015, managing partner Julio Febrer announced that La Tasca would close its doors on September 27, because of a severe drop in traffic following the April 2015 Baltimore riots. Summer tourism never fully recovered, which made the massive 400-seat space financially unsustainable. As a result, the restaurant chose to not renew its lease. Edo Sushi also left around that year.

Ashkenazy later announced aesthetic renovation plans, estimated to cost $15 million. The new design plans were revealed in October 2015 by architect MG2 of Seattle, Washington, and were for to revitalize the struggling complex. In July 2015, Hooters planned to relocate from its original space on the second floor of the Light Street Pavilion to the facility's food court space on the first floor, which was largely delayed due to landlord construction issues and storefront updates. The design for the Pratt Street Pavilion aimed to "turn the building inside out" to allow ground-floor tenants like IT'SUGAR to have their stores facing both the street and waterfront sides, and to become only accessible from the exterior entrances of themselves. Another plan for the new design was to replace the awnings and iconic "greenhouse"-like glass with blackened steel, timbered wood, and terra cotta panels. Classic materials would be painted over in contemporary black. Much of the second floor was planned to be an updated food court called "The Market at Harborplace", and Ashkenazy also planned on an updated, more modern tenant mix for both pavilions, such as Build-A-Bear Workshop.

The renovation required the demolition and closure of the Pratt Street Pavilion's concourse near the elevators. The escalators for the Light Street Pavilion were replaced with regular stairs. During this renovation period, IT'SUGAR and several other tenants temporarily relocated to the Light Street Pavilion. During the time of the proposal, Harborplace began struggling again. McCormick World of Flavors shuttered on August 14, 2016. Bubba Gump filed a lawsuit against Ashkenazy in November 2016, alleging that they failed to maintain the property. The following maintenance issues the restaurant cited were:

- Worn-out floors.
- Dirty bathrooms with ineffective stall locks.
- Broken escalators.
- Failed HVAC systems.
- Rusted metal stairs and broken concrete.
- Chipped or worn-out painting.
- Defective and damaged doors.
- Broken windows.
- Poor or malfunctioning lighting.
- Fire hazards from faulty electrical outlets, hanging wires, and overloaded electrical systems.
- Rodent infestations and leaking roofs.
- Sewage overflow.

The maintenance issues initially became a major concern when the Baltimore City Health Department closed the Fudgery temporarily on March 17, 2016, after inspectors found a "heavy mouse infestation," as well as an overflowing drain causing a stinky odor and an unsanitary environment. In May 2016, The Cheesecake Factory was also shut down temporarily due to rodent infestation, alongside 30+ other establishments in Baltimore City. It was also noted that water seepage would frequently occur in the pavilions' basement levels. Tenants also complained that Ashkenazy did not provide adequate security for the pavilions, resulting in frequent crime that deterred shoppers and even led some businesses, such as Hooters, to pay for their own security. Philly Pretzel Factory opened in early April 2017 days before the fire at Ripley's.

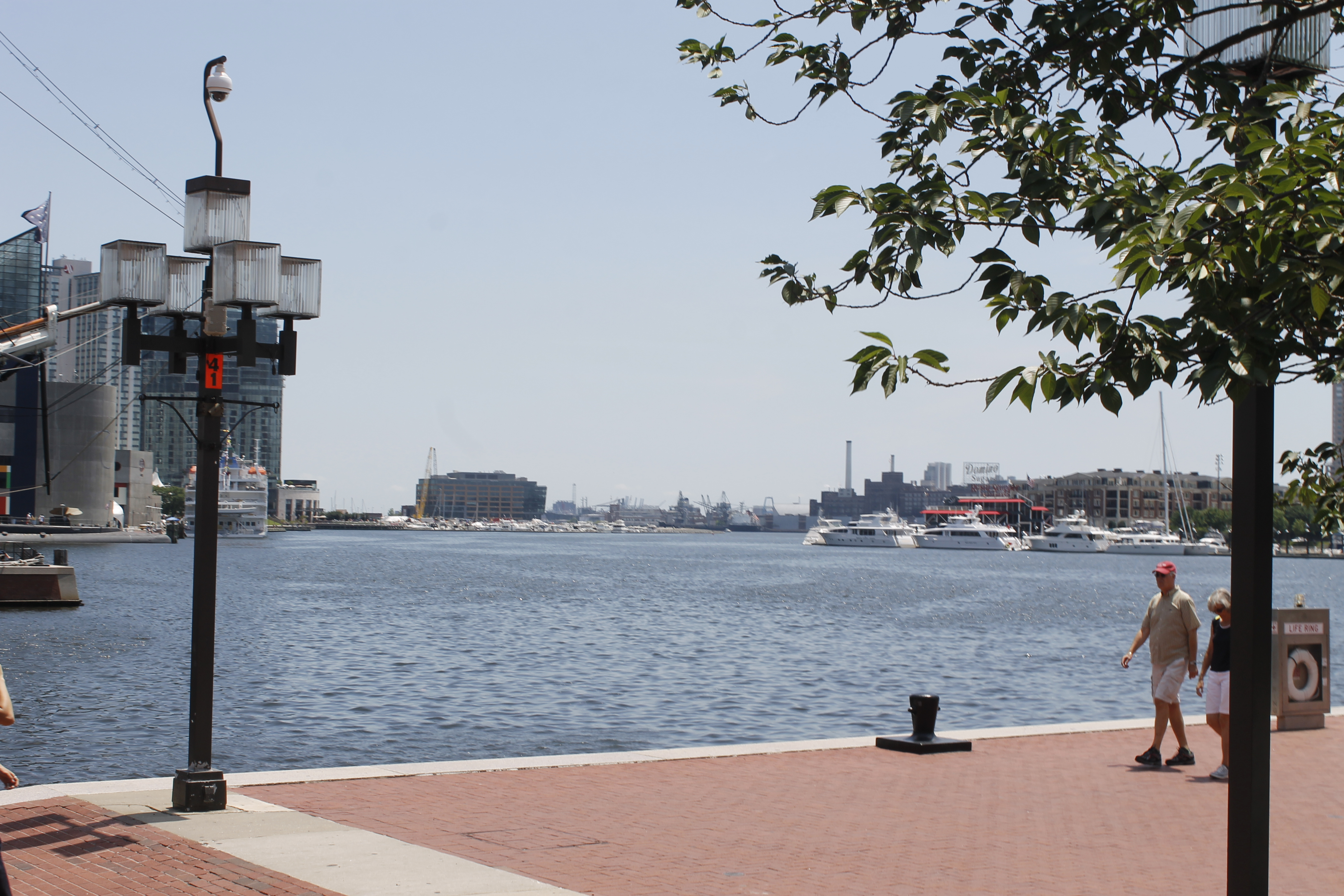
A Super Cube street lamp on the Harborplace promenade (on the left)

Ashkenazy's renovations consolidated with the Inner Harbor 2.0 plan, the BMore Bright initiative, and the Lights Out Baltimore project which involved replacing all of the iconic Super Cube light fixtures, colloquially known as "the Sugar Cubes," designed by George Kostritsky, the "K" in RTKL Associates with 143 new wooden LED light poles designed by Structura, which was completed in 2018. The replacement was made because the original sodium light fixtures were burning out, becoming difficult to maintain and repair, leading to dark areas on the waterfronts, and also caused migrating bird problems due to their upward-facing position. The new light fixtures point downward and are shielded, reducing this issue. The Super Cube light fixtures remained on the street side of the pavilions, but all of the Super Cube light fixtures near The Gallery at Harborplace have been replaced.

Construction on the renovation, however, was largely stalled. It started in December 2016, with the main entrance of the Pratt Street Pavilion being temporarily closed to the public, and fencing being placed around the property. Construction ended in April 2018 with the updated IT'SUGAR, and later that year, when renovations for both pavilions were only partially completed. The majority of the renovations were only completed for the Pratt Street Pavilion, and only a few tenants from the renovation plans, such as Mason's Famous Lobster Rolls (opened March 2019) and Crepe Lena Ice Cream & Funnel Cake had spots in the updated space.

Urban Outfitters would close on January 7, 2018, due to an expiring lease. In June 2018, Bubba Gump Shrimp Co. won a $1.13 to $1.2 million judgment against Ashkenazy Acquisition Corp. for allowing the property to deteriorate. However, a portion of it was returned in October 2019 following an appeal. Five Guys and Noodles & Co. left the pavilions in the summer of 2018. The Fudgery closed on September 9, 2018, due to profitability problems. M&S Grill closed permanently in October 2018. The former Urban Outfitters space was replaced with local merchandise store Neighborhoods Urban Goods, which sells Baltimore Orioles and Baltimore Ravens t-shirts.

On June 5, 2019, Cordish Companies CEO and Chairman David S. Cordish—which developed and operates the nearby Pratt Street Power Plant and Power Plant Live!—discussed that he would be interested in "the rebirth of Harborplace," having already attempted to acquire it from GGP a decade prior. In August 2019, Banana Republic closed its store in the Pratt Street Pavilion, just one year after relocating from The Gallery in February 2018 despite strong sales. By that year, the pavilions faced strong competition from other festival marketplaces and nearby similar markets, particularly the Broadway Market in Fells Point, which underwent a major renovation that year. The Inner Harbor itself was already declining in the 2020s, drawing shoppers to better–performing areas like Harbor East and Canton. In March 2019, Deutsche Bank informed that Ashkenazy defaulted on a $76 million loan after failing to satisfy Bubba Gump's 2018 judgment.

For failing to maintain the property and leaving vendors unpaid, Ashkenazy's local affiliate, AAC HP Realty LLC, was evicted from ownership and management of Harborplace by Judge Albert J. Matricciani Jr., and the property was put on court-ordered receivership on May 30, 2019. The Baltimore City Circuit Court had appointed IVL Group, LLC of Montclair, New Jersey to manage, maintain, lease, provide security for Harborplace, and the receivership order also authorized IVL Group to seek a new buyer. Immediately after the receivership, Jimmy Buffett's LandShark Bar & Grill announced that they would open in the former IT'SUGAR space at the Light Street Pavilion in June 2019. However, by October of that year, the parent company, IMCMV Holdings, revealed that lease negotiations were still up in the air, and as of March 2020, the restaurant never opened. Johnny Rockets closed again on September 30, 2019, due to "renting issues." Even after Ashkenazy was forced to hand over the property, the pavilions were still in poor condition. In August 2019, the Baltimore Development Corporation (BDC) CEO Colin Tarbert inspected both malls. He found burned-out lighting, damaged signage, and faulty doors. His following response was:

It was an icon of Baltimore's renaissance, and now I don't think it does that.

— Colin Tarbert, CEO of the BDC

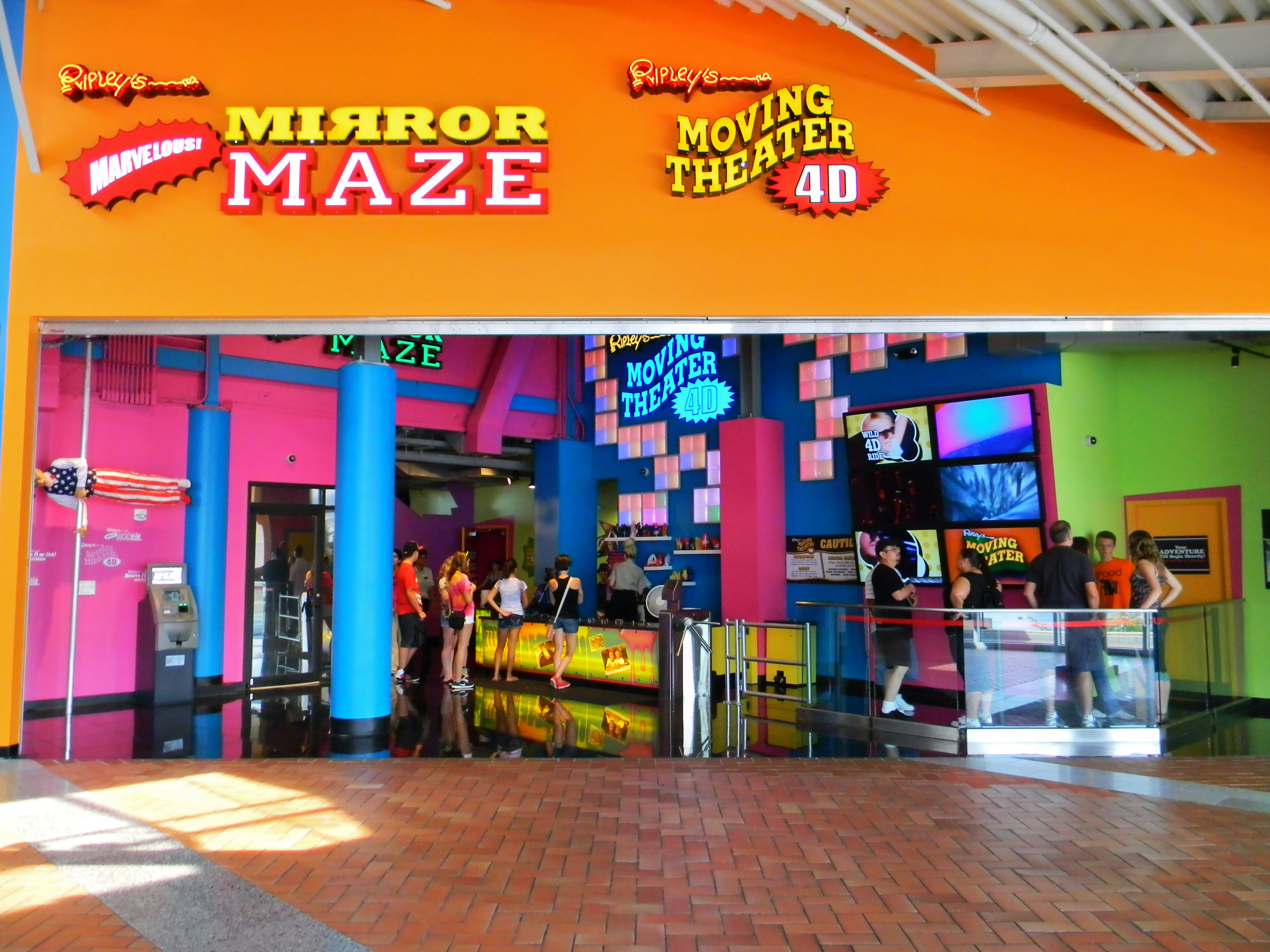
Entrance to Ripley's (September 2012)

By March 2020, Harborplace's decline was exacerbated by the COVID-19 pandemic, strict social distancing restrictions, and increased e-commerce competition. Ripley's Believe It or Not! closed permanently on May 15, 2020. Since the museum occupied two floors of the Light Street Pavilion, it formed a large, empty space. Shortly after Ripley's closed and no tenants remained, the Light Street Pavilion's second floor was completely closed to the public. Philly Pretzel Factory closed in February 2020, with franchise owner Michael Ward continuing to operate in Bel Air, Maryland. When Harborplace turned 40 years old on July 2, 2020, there was no celebration amid the receivership, lack of investment, locked doors, and the pandemic.

Build-A-Bear Workshop closed on September 13, 2021. Around 2022, Tir na nÓg left the Pratt Street Pavilion. On February 10, 2022, Bubba Gump Shrimp Co. closed its location in the Light Street Pavilion following a forced shutdown by the Baltimore City Health Department for major maintenance issues, and its failure to renew its food permit for the restaurant, which had both indoor and outdoor seating on the Harborplace promenade. Luke Kosters, an attorney and executive at Kelly Companies, which operated the Harborplace Bubba Gump, confirmed that the restaurant was permanently closed. He also cited that the major maintenance issues that caused their restaurant to shut down in the pavilion were a direct consequence of the previous owner, Ashkenazy Acquisition Corp. A representative for Landry's, Inc., the company that owns Bubba Gump, said the previous owners had done "essentially nothing" to maintain the property.

Crabby Jack's General Store closed in 2021, and Life in Charm City opened in the former Banana Republic space at the Pratt Street Pavilion. H&M closed its location in the Light Street Pavilion on March 9, 2022, leaving a largely vacant space. As a result, the Light Street Pavilion had only two remaining tenants in March 2022, and was near full vacancy. In April 2022, Harborplace in general was reported to be around 70% vacant. That month, the local development firm MCB Real Estate entered into an agreement to purchase the Harborplace pavilions out of receivership.

On September 28, 2022, Uno Pizzeria & Grill "temporarily" closed its location in the Pratt Street Pavilion, with franchise owner Amir Yazdi citing repairs needed for broken, inoperable kitchen equipment. The restaurant, however, never reopened, and MCB Real Estate confirmed that the closure was permanent shortly thereafter. After Uno Pizzeria & Grill closed, the Pratt Street Pavilion's last major sit-down restaurant tenant was The Cheesecake Factory, leaving it with three tenants the following month, and was also almost completely vacant. The Baltimore City Circuit Court finalized the acquisition deal with MCB in December 2022.

In April 2023, the Baltimore Brew reported that Harborplace was over 90% vacant, and founder Fern Shen noted the pavilions as having "empty shops, locked doors, and a fabulous view." She found a cracked window at one of the Pratt Street Pavilion's entrances (which she also reported made someone walk away from the pavilion), along with abandoned bedding and a pair of jeans on the second-floor balcony of the Light Street Pavilion, suggesting someone slept there. The pavilions had become dead malls, with only a handful of tenants still open. The Light Street Pavilion's interior was completely closed and locked up on April 19, 2023, and even the restrooms in the pavilion were blocked off. Hand-drawn signs by management were placed on the doors and windows, redirecting people to enter Hooters through the anchor tenant's main exterior entrance. However, the Pratt Street Pavilion was still open to the public, and the only major sit-down restaurant open was The Cheesecake Factory. Other tenants included IT'SUGAR, and some small souvenir and jewelry stores. Everything else—ranging from small restaurants to national retailers—were closed.

== Redevelopment ==
Harborplace Redevelopment
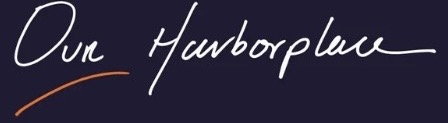

- A rendering of the proposed redevelopment, shows 303 Light St Apartments and The Wildset (left), The Park at Freedom's Port, The Sail and The Crescent (middle), and 203 E. Pratt St (right).
- Alternative names: Harborplace 2.0 (planning)

General information
- Status: On hold
- Type: Mixed-use
- Location: Baltimore, Maryland, United States, 201 and 203 E. Pratt Street, 21202; 301 and 303 S. Light Street, 21202
- Construction started: 2027 (expected)
- Estimated completion: Early 2030s

Technical details
- Floor count: 10/9 (Pratt Street); 32/25 (Light Street)

Design and construction
- Architects: Gensler; 3XN Architects; BCT Design Group; Several more
- Developer: MCB Real Estate
- Main contractor: Whiting-Turner

Website
- www.ourharborplace.com

On October 30, 2023, MCB Real Estate announced a proposal to demolish both pavilions and replace them with a 32-story apartment building known as the South Tower and a 25-story apartment building known as the North Tower on 303 Light St, and two commercial and retail buildings, and another retail building with an amphitheater on Pratt St. To proceed, the project would require a charter amendment to allow residential development, rezoning changes, and an amendment to the city's urban renewal plan governing the Inner Harbor, which was approved by Baltimore voters in November 2024. MCB began soil testing on the pavilions for demolition in December 2024.

The new 201 East Pratt Street building is planned to offer both retail and commercial space. It will house a marketplace on the first two floors, and its design was inspired by the water. It is colloquially called The Sail due to its shape. The 203 East Pratt Street building between The Sail and the World Trade Center will offer waterfront commercial space, and public space underneath a cantilevered second floor. The amphitheater and surrounding green space will be known as The Park at Freedom's Port and will have ≈2,000 seats, including an elevated space for dining and recreation. Underneath the dining space and amphitheater will be artistic and retail lining an eastward extension of Camden Street towards the water. The 303 South Light Street apartment towers will offer multifamily residential on the upper floors, while the first two floors will involve retail, dining, and community space. 301 South Light Street will involve a marketplace nicknamed The Wildset, which is planned to house retail and dining options. The design is inspired by Maryland's shipbuilding heritage and local seafood. The Harborplace promenade will also be updated to become two-tiered, giving people an interactive experience with the water, with the nickname The Crescent. The redevelopment plan consolidates with MCB's plan for a 300 East Pratt Street mixed-use building.

=== Reception ===
The redevelopment plans have been criticized, with complaints that the new 303 Light St apartment towers block views, and fears that the apartment towers, along with the 203 Pratt St building, will privatize the waterfront, limiting public access. Former Baltimore mayor Martin O'Malley famously stated that the redevelopment plans were a "terrible developer grab of public waterfront parkland", voting "No" during Question F in November 2024. Some people have also argued for alternatives to demolition, such as renovation of the pavilions into an entertainment district with local restaurants and music activity. Others have proposed to replace the pavilions with a full "parks-only" space which involved turning the area into an exclusive green space.

James Rouse's sons, Jimmy Rouse (nicknamed James Rouse Jr.) and Ted Rouse have also criticized the redevelopment plans, with Jimmy Rouse arguing for an alternative for demolition by renovating the pavilions for markets, such as seafood, produce, and crafts, echoing James Rouse's vision. The Rouse family has also criticized the apartment towers, seeing them as intrusive, and that the plans lack what James Rouse intended, calling it a "blank check giveaway" for a developer.

Ted Rouse pushed for mandatory design review and underground parking for aesthetics. He also pushed for funding commitments before demolition to prevent the risk of the Harborplace site from becoming an empty, undeveloped plot, similar to the Morris A. Mechanic Theatre. Rouse joined the Inner Harbor Coalition, a protest that involved concerns about the redevelopment plans.

==== Developer's response ====
P. David Bramble, co-founder and a managing partner of MCB Real Estate responded to the criticism by rejecting parks-only replacements, arguing that an exclusive green space is not in the best interest of Baltimore, as the current pavilions, albeit largely vacant, are a critical commercial component to the Inner Harbor.

He has also argued that the apartment towers are necessary because the retail-only format of Harborplace is outdated, and also stating that blending retail and residential is standard in contemporary development, and that it is essential for "financial, economic sustainability." He also stated that a modern waterfront requires a mix of uses to be successful. During a T.J. Smith Show interview, Bramble dismissed backlash for the Light St towers as "silly," stating that "everywhere you go, it's apartments and retail."

Bramble has also rejected alternatives to demolition, including converting the Harborplace pavilions into an entertainment district or keeping them as a festival marketplace, arguing that a retail-only or market-only approach is not sustainable. He also added that renovation is no longer viable as an alternative, as the pavilions have numerous maintenance issues resulting from Ashkenazy, including broken HVAC, mold buildup, and rodent infestations. Because of these maintenance problems, a renovation would've been prohibitively expensive, potentially even more expensive than demolition.

He doesn't want alternatives, or what he refers to them as "Plan Bs", and he warned that if his redevelopment plan is rejected, the city will be "stuck with exactly what you have there", which means MCB, or any out-of-town owner might acquire the pavilions and "fill them up with... some junk" (short-term fixes such as filling in vacant spaces with national stores to generate cash flow) that might cause another insolvency.

=== 2023–2026: BOOST tenants, continued decline ===
External videos
- Harborplace pavilions to be torn down, WMAR-2 News

Beginning in September 2023, the pavilions were filled with temporary local businesses as part of Downtown Partnership of Baltimore's BOOST (Black Owned and Operated Storefront Tenancy) program, also known as the Local Tenancy Plan (LTP), which was to activate the waterfront area and prevent the area from becoming a "ghost town" while redevelopment plans are being finalized. A Made In Baltimore holiday store opened on the first floor of the former H&M space in November 2023 as a pop-up, and as a permanent location in February 2024. A Koi Story officially opened its storefront at the Light Street Pavilion on December 8, 2023. Founded by former college football player Allan Koi and professional skateboarder Joey Jett, the concept combined an apparel brand with a popular food venue known as GOODfood, serving what locals called "the best chicken sandwich in Baltimore."

Crust by Mack, operated by Amanda Mack, would open in the former Edo Sushi space at the Pratt Street Pavilion on the weekend of January 13 to 14, 2024 at 11 a.m. to 5 p.m. EST. MoreLife Organic Juice opened on Juneteenth 2024. Angeli's Pizzeria opened as a pop-up restaurant at the Light Street Pavilion on March 27, 2024, alongside Matriarch Coffee in the former M&S Grill space at the Pratt Street Pavilion, with 600 sq ft (56 m^{2}). Angeli's Pizzeria opened as a permanent location in August 2025.

In January 2024, Hooters sued both Ashkenazy and MCB Real Estate for breach of lease; specifically, failing to provide adequate security for the Light Street Pavilion following a break-in incident in September 2023. They also described the pavilion as "unkempt, dirty, and poorly maintained," which completely harmed their business. When the tenant closed in June 2024, the Light Street Pavilion had no restaurants and only two retail stores left being Made In Baltimore and Neighborhoods Urban Goods. However, in November 2024, MCB Real Estate countersued Hooters, citing that the tenant violated its lease by reducing hours before leaving. Crust by Mack announced on November 11, 2024, that they would shut down the Harborplace location, citing a shift toward catering, private workshops, and specialty event rentals. This makes it the first BOOST tenant to leave the pavilions.

The former Johnny Rockets space was taken over by Nostalgia Diner, operated by the award-winning H3irloom Food Group, led by chefs David and Tonya Thomas, as a pop-up restaurant that opened on January 17, 2025, and due to the demolition timeline, the restaurant operates exclusively on Fridays and Saturdays. In July 2025, Caribbean brick-and-mortar restaurant Waiting to Oxtail opened in the former Oleum Kitchen restaurant space. Oleum Kitchen closed its doors on April 10, 2025, because its owner, Alisha Adibe, announced that she was moving her vegan restaurant to Fells Point, which opened a month before Waiting for Oxtail took over her former spot at Harborplace.

The former Hooters space was replaced by Supano's Sports Bar & Grill Steakhouse (formerly Supano's Prime Steakhouse), which held its grand opening on October 17, 2025, by owner Terry Coffman, which relocated the long-running restaurant from Water Street. MCB Real Estate confirmed that the vendors of the BOOST program were fully aware that the pavilions would be demolished, and as a result, they had short leases; in the case of Supano, that had an 18-month lease. MCB will help these tenants relocate when construction begins, and they will potentially be offered to reopen in Harborplace once redevelopment is finished. The last remaining national tenant not part of the BOOST program, IT'SUGAR, will likely also be relocated, but its future in Harborplace is uncertain as of September 2026.

Announced in August 2025, the pavilions were expected to start demolition in the fall of 2026. Redevelopment is expected to be completed by the 2030s. The adjacent structures would remain open during this period, except for the defunct Gallery mall, and the entrance to the skywalk connecting that mall to the Pratt Street Pavilion would be completely blocked off for construction. MCB even debunked misconceptions that the Harborplace redevelopment would include The Gallery. Specifically, they responded to a question asking what the relationship of Harborplace was to The Gallery in their FAQ of the project, and MCB simply stated, "The Gallery is privately owned by an unaffiliated entity [Brookfield Properties]." The project will be funded, developed, and operated under MCB HP Baltimore. To ensure the new buildings will not fall into disrepair again, the Harborplace Ground Lease now includes a maintenance standard for the property.

On December 4, 2025, The Cheesecake Factory, which has been a tenant in Harborplace for nearly 30 years, announced that it was closing its Harborplace location on January 24, 2026, citing that after an "extensive review and analysis," The Cheesecake Factory made the "difficult decision to discontinue operation." This leaves the Pratt Street Pavilion with no more restaurants. The Cheesecake Factory officially ceased operations at 11:00 p.m. EST on January 24, 2026, and its 115 employees have been redirected to other Cheesecake Factory locations in Maryland still in operation. The restaurant's signage was also eventually removed. This makes IT'SUGAR the last national chain in operation at the property.

The Maryland Department of the Environment (MDE) held a public hearing for the redevelopment on March 25, 2026. The project was still met with concerns related to the apartment towers. The promenade will be raised to reduce the risk of flooding. To make business closures happen near the pavilions' end, state lawmakers passed special emergency legislation to waive strict capital and seating requirements for their Inner Harbor liquor license transfer.

The Spirit of Baltimore Inner Harbor port, which was formerly situated at the Harborplace waterfront, was slated to cease operations in April 2026, and one of its ships would relocate to Washington, D.C. in March. The company's other Baltimore ship, The Majesty, would continue to operate until the final April 25 deadline before also departing. On May 14, 2026, MCB Real Estate announced that the curved connection between Light Street and Calvert Street would close permanently in November to allow for construction. However, it was later announced on May 20, 2026, that the Baltimore City Council would have to approve the permanent closure of the traffic spur.

Announced on June 26, 2026, Made in Baltimore would close after June 28, 2026. Announced on July 10, 2026, Cuples Tea House and Vinyls and Pages will close permanently on September 30, 2026, and the Dodsons have stated that they will continue to operate in pop-ups and other locations at local hotels. Concerns regarding the redevelopment project never starting reignited on July 22, 2026, when Bolton Hill resident Dolph Druckman used Google Gemini to generate an image of the Inner Harbor without the pavilions or the new buildings, though it was criticized for inaccuracies. MCB hired Whiting-Turner, the same firm involved in the original pavilions, as the main contractor for the project, and explained that the demolition is the first phase of the project as the 1970s promenade needs to be updated to address rising sea level issues, and to rebuild the underground piping and utility lines as part of the Inner Harbor Park and Promenade Project initiative.

On August 12, 2026, MCB filed permits that allowed fencing, a future splash pad, paving and beams, with an expected demolition date of October 15 awaiting approval.

==== Demolition controversy and litigation ====
On September 17, 2026, MCB announced that Harborplace would not be demolished in the fall and would stay operational through New Year's Day 2027, making the redevelopment plans and Harborplace's future uncertain. CollegiateLuxe HBCU expanded, moving into the former Made in Baltimore space. On the following day, rival developer and Terra Nova Ventures founder David Tufaro filed an application to designate Harborplace as a Maryland Historical Trust (MHT) landmark, with state officials saying that the pavilions are eligible for inclusion in the National Register of Historic Places (NRHP). Tufaro filed the application as an effort to stop demolition. On September 21, 2026, seven local residents filed a lawsuit against the city and MCB, accusing Mayor Brandon Scott, the Baltimore City Council, and the Baltimore Board of Estimates of orchestrating a rushed, secretive plan to privatize public land and hand it over to a preferred developer, violating the Maryland Constitution and requesting a court order to halt demolition until the legal dispute has been resolved.

MCB fired back on September 24, 2026, when spokeswoman Alexandra Hughes posted a notice on Harborplace's website accusing the seven opponents of only filing the lawsuit to preserve the "nostalgia for a few" over "progress for all". Tufaro labeled this a "terrible argument", citing that the lawsuit is because of government failure rather than nostalgia. He argued that the Baltimore Development Corporation (BDC) and the city controlled the site under a lease and held the sole oversight responsibility to ensure the property did not go into decline, and that the city never issued a public Request for Proposals (RFP) or made the public aware of alternative options, effectively cutting out competing local developers.

On October 2, 2026, the Inner Harbor Coalition nominated Harborplace to the National Trust for Historic Preservation to be listed on America's 11 Most Endangered Places' 2027 list, explicitly using data from the original 1980 opening to justify an inclusion. By that day, some of the final stores inside the pavilions have confinued to pack up; Neighborhoods Urban Goods planned to vacate by Halloween 2026, while Life in Charm City would close its doors on October 25. Store closure signs were visible on Life in Charm City's storefront, which, under Rouse's ownership, was prohibited. Matriarch Coffee plans to relocate to a new location on Pratt Street that is under construction as of September 2026, while an employee of Mason's Famous Lobster Rolls stated that they might close in November. Luis Medina of LAMESA Raw, which is one of the last remaining businesses that had involvement with the Rouse Co., plans to move out of Harborplace at the end of the year and focus on its Fells Point location.

On October 14, 2026, Brandon Scott stated that he insists on demolition, even if actual redevelopment does not happen.

=== Events ===
==== Holiday Makers Market (December 6–7, 2025) ====
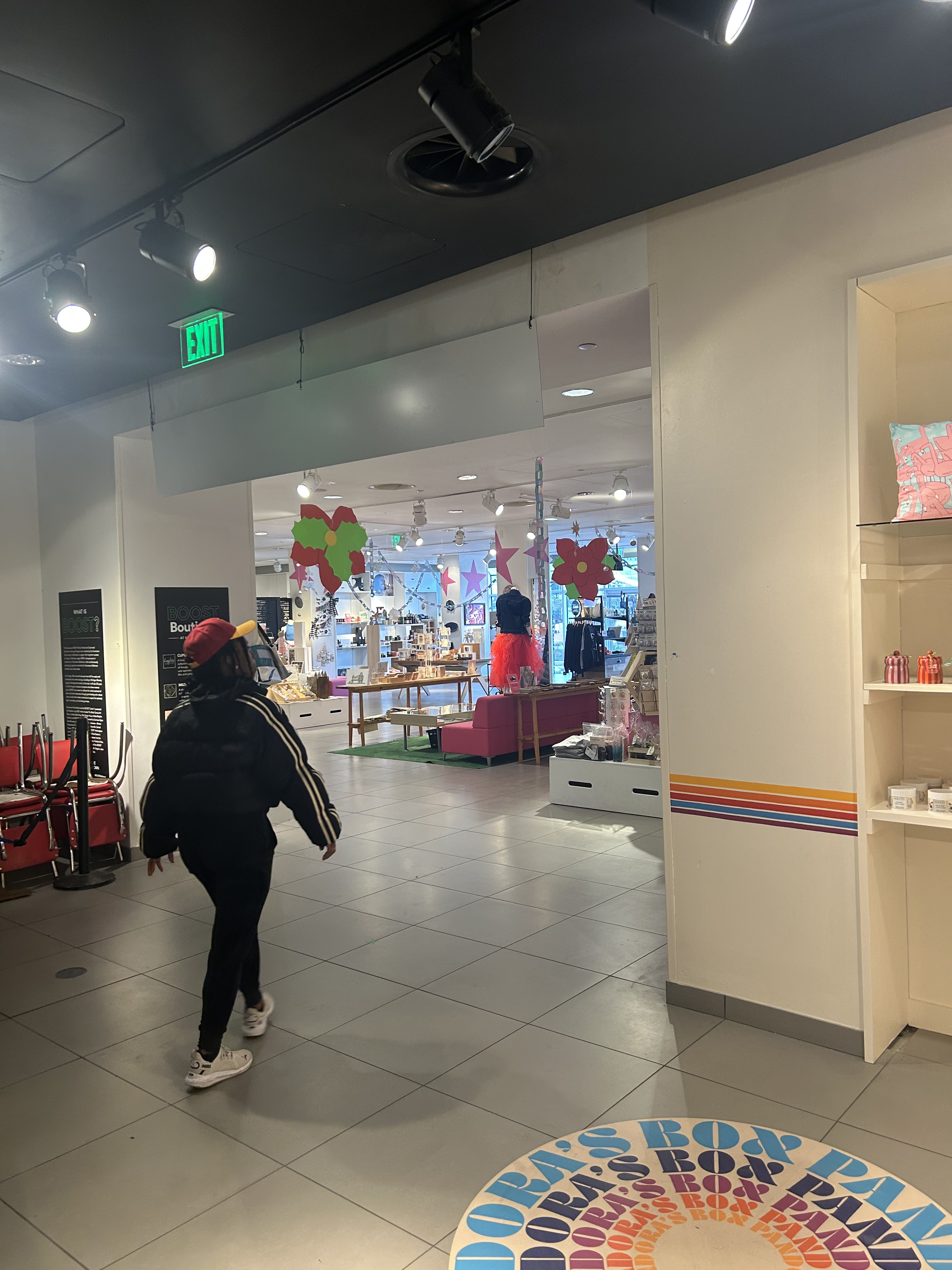
The Light Street Pavilion's Made In Baltimore store during the Holiday Makers Market event on December 6, 2025.

From December 6 to 7, 2025, Harborplace held a Holiday Makers Market event that was Christmas themed, and it included 60+ local vendors and Christmas music, particularly in the Light Street Pavilion. The Light Street Pavilion was also updated to include purple neon lights on its second-floor exterior arches. The event consolidated with the nearby German Christmas Village, which is a few walks away from the Light Street Pavilion. The Christmas Village included rides, such as a Ferris wheel. The Baltimore Visitor Center featured snack options. In March 2026, the Christmas Village was approved to operate for four more years, though the Baltimore Department of Real Estate (DORE) warned that its West Shore Park location "may be impacted by the Harborplace redevelopment".

==== Sail250 Maryland & Airshow Baltimore (June 24 – July 1, 2026) ====
Sail250 Maryland & Airshow Baltimore (or simply Sail250) was an event to celebrate America's 250th birthday. The event took place on the Harborplace promenade as a farewell party for the pavilions, including maritime ships and jet planes (U.S. Navy Blue Angels), and live music. The event would not just be in Harborplace; the celebration will span the Inner Harbor, Baltimore Peninsula, and Fells Point. P. David Bramble considered Sail250 to be a "grand send-off" for the pavilions, as this would be the final event to be held at Harborplace before "shovels hit the ground." However, since demolition was delayed as of September 2026, this will likely not be the final event.

A three-day educational and family-oriented festival (June 26–28) took place along the promenade featuring a dedicated STEM Tent and Living History demonstrations focused on maritime heritage and technology, a Seafood for Thought interactive cooking demo stage and a food program showcasing Baltimore cuisine. Entertainment included live music and various historical exhibits. As one of five major U.S. port cities celebrating the 250th, massive crowds were expected throughout the weekend.

== Notable incidents ==
Harborplace and the surrounding area has had many crime, lawsuits, and inclement weather problems occur, which played a role in the area's decline. Notable examples of this include:

=== 1990s Hooters controversy ===
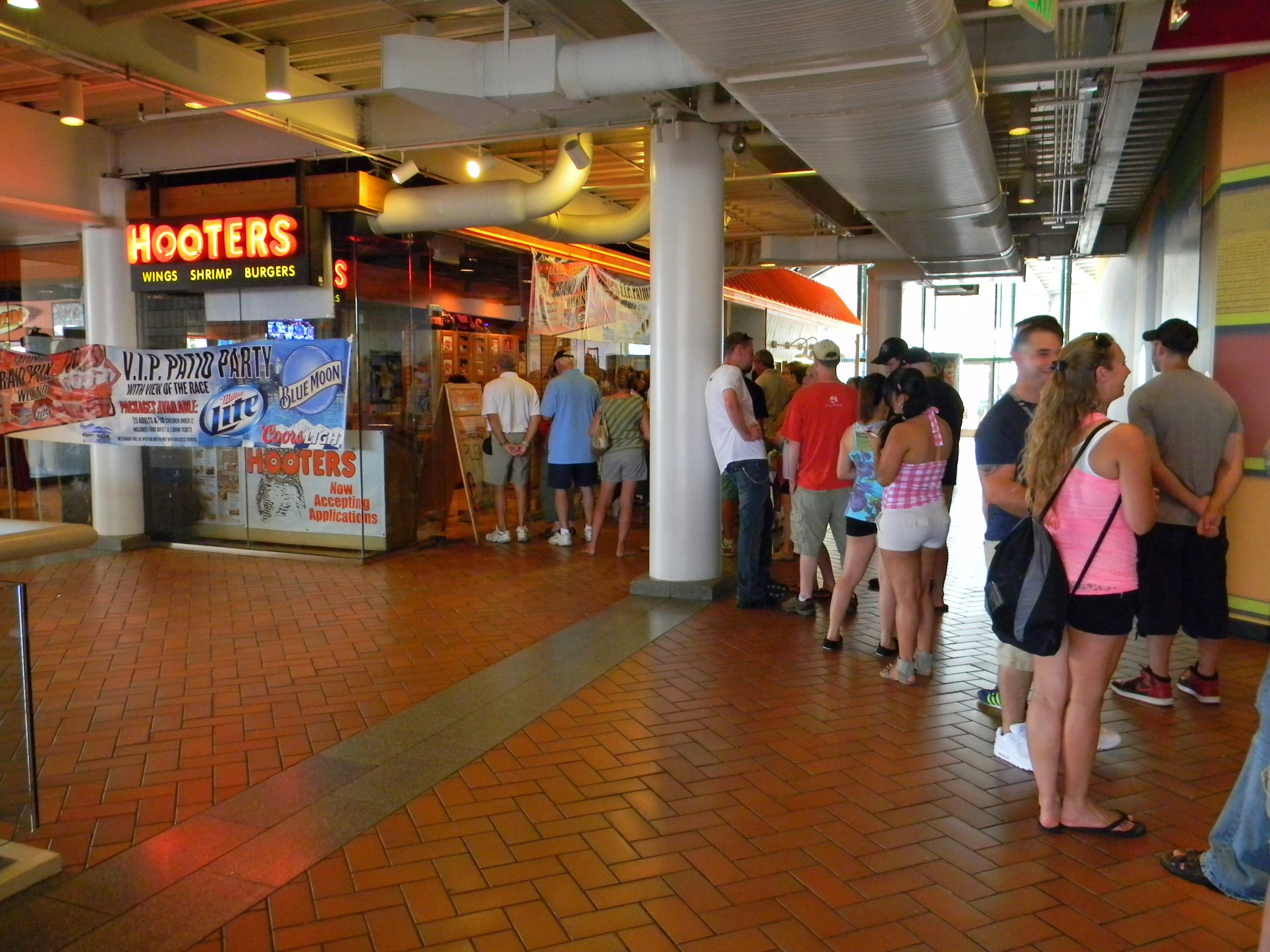
Interior view near Hooters, second floor, c. September 2012

Shortly after Hooters opened in the Light Street Pavilion, the company faced massive criticism for being accused of "discriminatory and sexist" and "slyly sinister" behavior. Specifically, the restaurant was known for hiring only women as servants (referred to by the brand as Hooters Girls), and having suggestive contests, such as hula-hoop contests and bikini contests. Critics and legal challenges from the Equal Employment Opportunity Commission (EEOC), the National Organization for Women (NOW) and U.S. Sen. Barbara Mikulski argued this was a violation of anti-discrimination laws. Backlash was exacerbated by the tank-tops the female servants would wear, which were largely seen as "suggestive and inappropriate" by families.

The backlash was so intense that city officials and Rouse executives forced the Harborplace Hooters to modify its conduct shortly after opening, such as banning suggestive slogans like "More than a mouthful" and certain provocative activities common at other locations. Specifically, Baltimore City Council President Mary Pat Clarke and Rouse Company CEO Mathias J. DeVito led a charge against the restaurant, requesting that it change its "sexist" signs, menus, and employee uniforms. While Hooters accepted the requests to change its inappropriate business practices, the restaurant still denied men as servants, and therefore, backlash persisted. The restaurant eventually responded by defensively stating that being female was a "bona fide occupational qualification" (BFOQ) that is essential to their brand.

The restaurant was sued in 1997 for $3.75 million in damages by men who were denied server jobs, with people even calling for the city to ban, or legally evict Hooters from the area, as its business practices violated the Inner Harbor's original purpose as a family-friendly environment. The situation was settled in 1997. Hooters lost the lawsuit and was forced to pay the demanded $3.75 million in response to its business practices, with the City of Baltimore and the Rouse Co. permitting Hooters to continue employing only female servers, but forcing the company to create "gender-neutral" positions—such as hosts, bartenders, and kitchen staff—that men could apply for. The city and the Rouse Co. also banned the restaurant's contests common at other locations, including bikini contests, as well as not allowing the restaurant's prominent signage to be present on the exterior of the building, only having the orange Hooters logo wording. Some contests were heavily modified to match the rest of the Inner Harbor.

=== 1997 Phillips Seafood workplace homicide ===
In October 1997, a 20-year-old Phillips Harborplace Express cook Darryl Luttrell was fatally stabbed by their kitchen supervisor, William Leroy Berkley. After the workplace incident, police charged Berkley with first-degree murder, assault, and using a deadly weapon in the commission of a felony.

=== Impact of 9/11 attacks ===
Two hours after the September 11 attacks on the World Trade Center in New York City, the entire waterfront where both the Baltimore World Trade Center and Harborplace are, was restricted from pedestrian, vehicle and boat access due to a "credible" threat that it would be attacked. Both the pavilions and The Gallery were evacuated and closed temporarily. Bomb threats received on September 12 and 14 further contributed to security measures.

=== 2000s freedom of speech problems ===
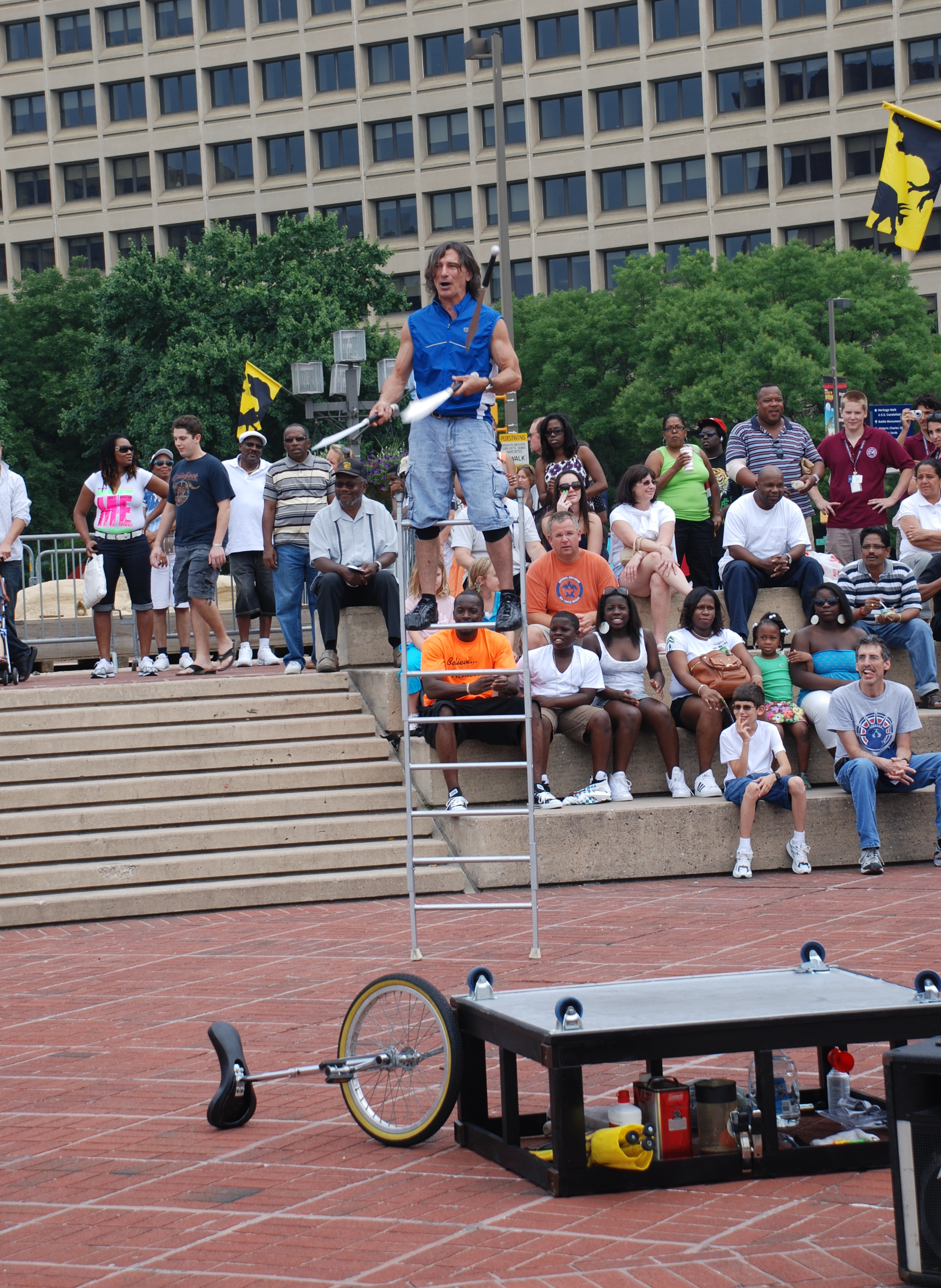
A street performer at the Harborplace Amphitheater Outdoor Stage near McKeldin Square in 2009

The Rouse Company had long experienced tensions with street performers, regulating performances and accused of suppressing free speech. Disputes came to a head in 2002 until 2003, when two events triggered a lawsuit against the city.

==== ACLU lawsuit ====
On October 21, 2002, street performer Jerry Rowan was banned from the area for making an "insensitive" joke. Discussing the then-current D.C. sniper case, Rowan said: "I was driving downtown this morning, and on the radio I heard that they've finally come out with a composite of the sniper, so there should be an arrest forthcoming. Apparently, he's a white guy that speaks Spanish and looks like he's Arab." Police officers overheard the joke and reported it to Rouse. The company had previously sent a letter to Rowan admonishing him for "off-color humor", as well as "lack of respect for program administrators". After this report, The Rouse Company permanently banned Rowan from the area.

On April 4, 2003, a police officer asked Baltimore's Women in Black to disband. The group had (and has) gathered in McKeldin Square every Friday since September 11, 2002. Rowan and the Women in Black filed a lawsuit against the city of Baltimore and the Rouse Company on October 7, 2003, arguing their right of free speech. They were assisted by attorney Rajeev Goyle on behalf of the American Civil Liberties Union.

The lawsuit was resolved in 2013 in a settlement that resulted in a consent decree with the city, creating "instant permits" for spontaneous demonstrations and waived permit requirements for groups of 30 people or less. The negotiations with the ACLU, the city, General Growth Properties, and The Waterfront Partnership of Baltimore in the settlement yielded other specific results in favor of free speech activities. McKeldin Square, Rash Field, Kaufman Pavilion, the area West of the Visitor Center, and Area 10 were all designated as official free-speech zones. Additionally, the settlement required the City of Baltimore to pay the attorney's fees for the ACLU.

=== 2003 Hurricane Isabel flooding ===
In September 2003, the entire Inner Harbor area, including Harborplace and the adjacent World Trade Center, was critically damaged as a result of Hurricane Isabel, ultimately considered the area's worst flooding since the 1933 Chesapeake–Potomac hurricane.

A record storm surge reached 8.2 feet at Fort McHenry and the Inner Harbor, flooding Pratt and Light Streets, which resulted in a massive surge of water at the Harborplace and Inner Harbor promenades and the ground floors of both pavilions to be flooded.

The Pratt Street Pavilion's outdoor walkway and multiple stores in both pavilions suffered extensive water damage and power outages. The adjacent World Trade Center's basement was destroyed by 3 million gallons of water, closing the tower and leading to a loss of 60 tenants. As a result, the city and the Rouse Company closed the pavilions and The Gallery temporarily for repairs and upgrades. For safety reasons, Rouse also turned off the electricity and HVAC systems for the entire complex to prevent further mechanical damage and electrical fires from saltwater exposure.

Legal Sea Foods, located at 100 E. Pratt Street, adjacent to the pavilions, was completely destroyed by the hurricane. It was rebuilt, but closed its doors in December 2007.

=== Additional Hooters controversy (2012–2013) ===
In June 2012, a waitress known as Jheri Stratton allegedly contracted tuberculosis at the restaurant, leading to a lawsuit after the Health Department declined to shut down the facility, sparking public concern.

In October 2013, a Black waitress, Farryn Johnson, was fired from the Harborplace Hooters for having blonde highlights in her hair. She filed a complaint alleging a racist double standard, as white and Asian coworkers were permitted to have colored streaks without penalty. A bill was planned to limit employers' ability to establish grooming standards.

=== Ripley's Believe It or Not! Spring 2017 fire ===
On the night of April 5, 2017, the Ripley's Believe It or Not! museum in the Light Street Pavilion suffered a fire, causing minimal damage and a temporary closure for cleanup and repairs. The cause of the fire is unknown.

=== Fall 2025 shooting ===
On September 14, 2025, police responded to gunfire that occurred in the area and found an 18-year-old male with a gunshot wound in his right arm and shoulder area.

A few hours after the incident, a 17-year-old male was assaulted inside Harborplace. This incident involved a group of individuals according to the police, one of whom was armed. The Baltimore Police classified the incident as an unarmed robbery.

== The Gallery at Harborplace ==
The Gallery at Harborplace

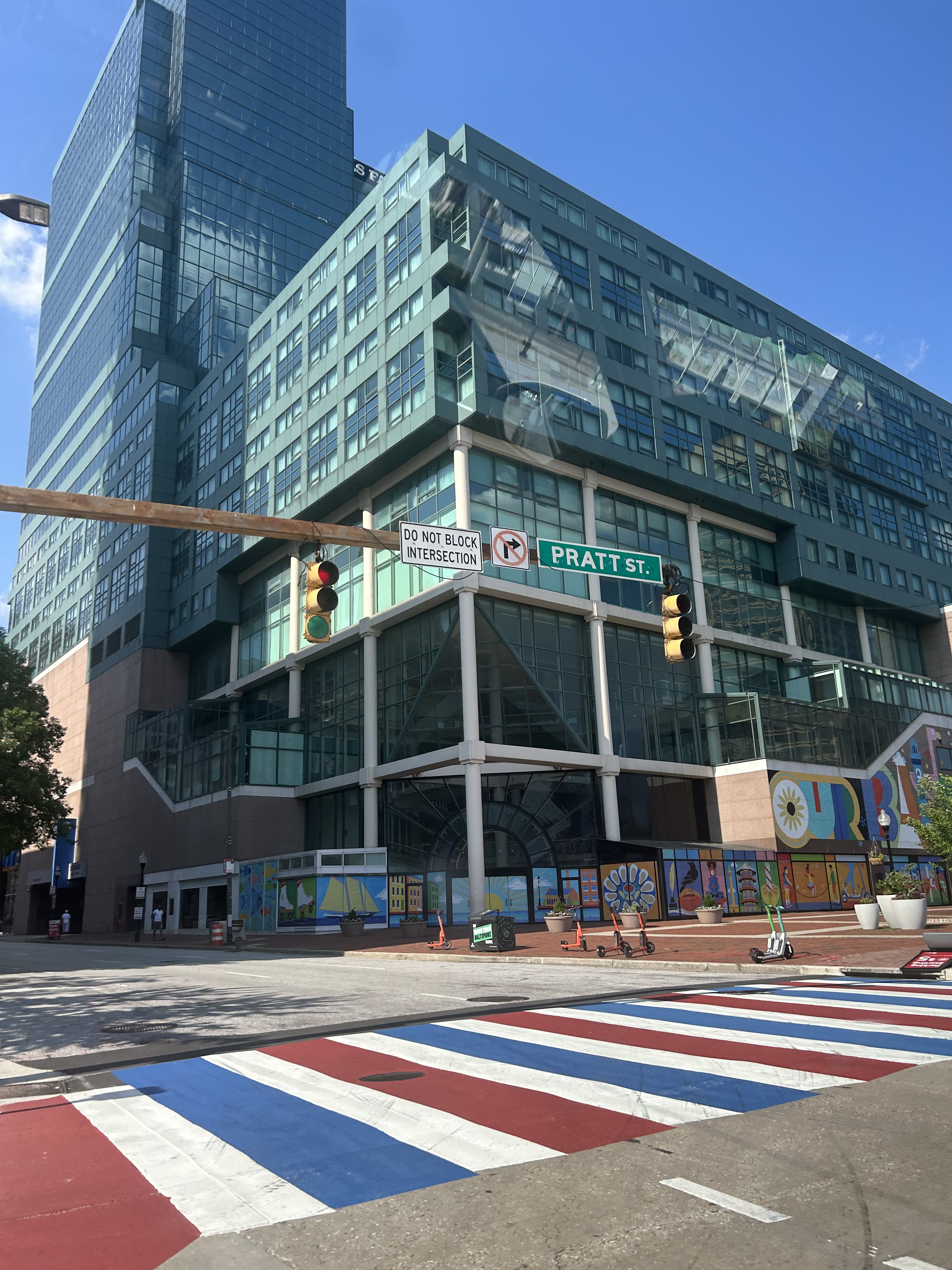
- Former entrance to the mall in July 2026 as viewed from both Pratt and Calvert Streets
- Former names: Harborplace Tower: Legg Mason Tower (1988–1997); Renaissance Hotel: Stouffer Harborplace Hotel (1988–1998)
- Alternative names: Harborplace Tower only: 111 S. Calvert Street; The Gallery at Harborplace Office Building; Wells Fargo Tower

General information
- Status: Operational (Shopping mall is permanently closed)
- Type: Mixed-use
- Location: Baltimore, Maryland, U.S., 200 E. Pratt Street, 21202 (shopping mall); 111 S. Calvert Street, 21202 (Harborplace Tower); 202 E. Pratt Street, 21202 (Renaissance Hotel)
- Coordinates: 39.287275°N 76.611472°W
- Construction started: 1985; 41 years ago
- Completed: 1988
- Opening: September 3, 1987; 39 years ago (shopping mall); February 1988; 38 years ago (Harborplace Tower); April 1988; 38 years ago (Renaissance Hotel)
- Renovated: Shopping mall: 2001; 2016; Renaissance Hotel: 2016; 2019; Harborplace Tower: 2022; 4 years ago
- Closed: December 31, 2021; 4 years ago (final retail tenants); January 21, 2022; 4 years ago (mall interior)
- Owner: Brookfield Properties (shopping mall, under GGP subsidiary, and Harborplace Tower); Torchlight Investors (Renaissance Hotel)
- Operator: GGP (shopping mall); CBRE Group (Harborplace Tower); DR VII REIT Holdings (Renaissance Hotel)

Height
- Height: 346 ft (4,150 in)

Technical details
- Floor count: Shopping mall: 5 (including one basement level) (Note: Three floors of retail, fourth floor was a food court until July 2016. Fifth floor is attached to the Renaissance Baltimore Harborplace Hotel. With the basement level, the mall has six floors.); Harborplace Tower: 28; Renaissance Hotel: 12
- Floor area: 544,453 square feet (50,581.3 m^{2}) (office); 100,769 square feet (9,400 m^{2}) (retail)

Design and construction
- Architect: Zeidler Roberts Partnership
- Developer: The Rouse Company
- Structural engineer: McNamara • Salvia
- Main contractor: HCB Contractors

Renovating team
- Renovating firm: The Rouse Co. (2001); General Growth Properties (2016)

Other information
- Number of stores: 80+ in Gallery mall (at peak; (Note: The GGP website for the property in this citation states 32 retailers, though the mall is no longer open.) 0 remaining as of December 2021)
- Number of anchors: 1 junior (vacant since February 2020)
- Number of rooms: 622 (in Renaissance Hotel)
- Number of suites: 36 (in Renaissance Hotel)
- Parking: Parking garage with 1,150 paid spaces

Website
- Official website at the Wayback Machine (archived 2021-01-04)
- Building details
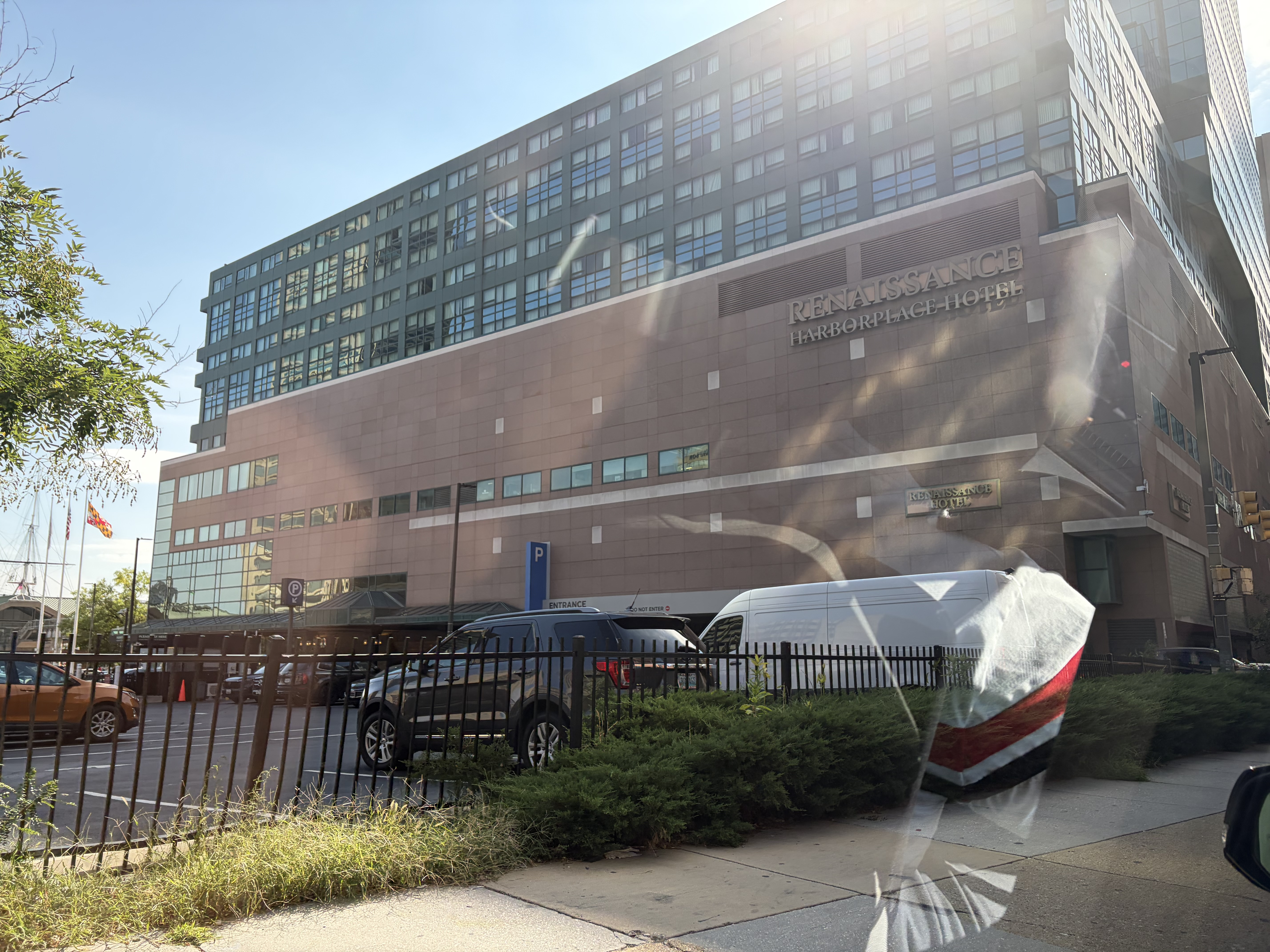
- Exterior view of the Renaissance hotel from Lombard Street (August 2026)

Across the street from the Pratt Street Pavilion is The Gallery at Harborplace (or simply referred to as The Gallery), a mixed-use development consisting of a glass-enclosed shopping mall of the same name with a five-story atrium, a 28-story Class A office building known as Harborplace Tower, and a 12-story hotel known as the Renaissance Baltimore Harborplace Hotel, formerly the Stouffer Harborplace Hotel when it opened. The entire mixed-use complex, which includes the Harborplace Tower, The Gallery and the Renaissance Hotel, had become the 21st tallest building in Baltimore.

As of January 2022, the shopping mall has been abandoned. The complex was developed by the Rouse Company, and had its grand opening celebration in early September 1987. as of December 2021, the former Gallery mall and Harborplace Tower remains owned by GGP, a subsidiary of BGRE (formerly Brookfield Properties), with the latter being managed by CBRE Group. The Gallery mall has struggled alongside the pavilions as a result of the rise of e-commerce and competition from suburban malls in Maryland, such as Arundel Mills, The Mall in Columbia, and Towson Town Center. The mall has also failed to adapt, having received zero renovations since 2001, though its fourth-floor food court was converted into Spaces, a coworking place in July 2016.

The COVID-19 pandemic acted as the final blow for the property, leading to Brookfield to evict the last remaining tenants by December 31, 2021. The shopping center ultimately closed its doors on January 21, 2022. In May 2023, a mural titled Our Baltimore was painted over the entrance windows, but since then, no redevelopment has taken place on the property, and it is also excluded from MCB Real Estate's redevelopment plans for the neighboring Harborplace pavilions.

=== Overview ===
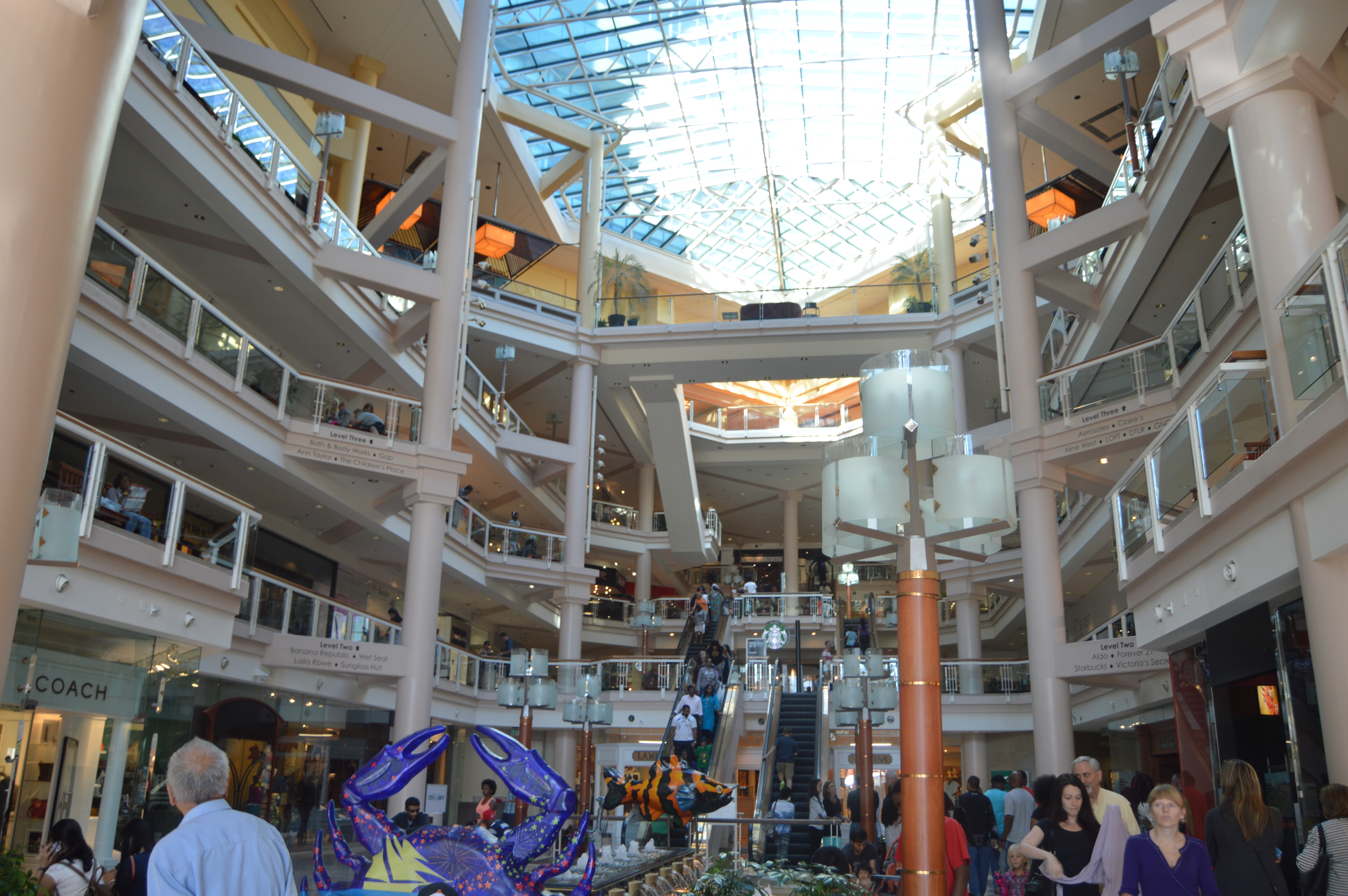
Central atrium of the Gallery mall (September 2014)

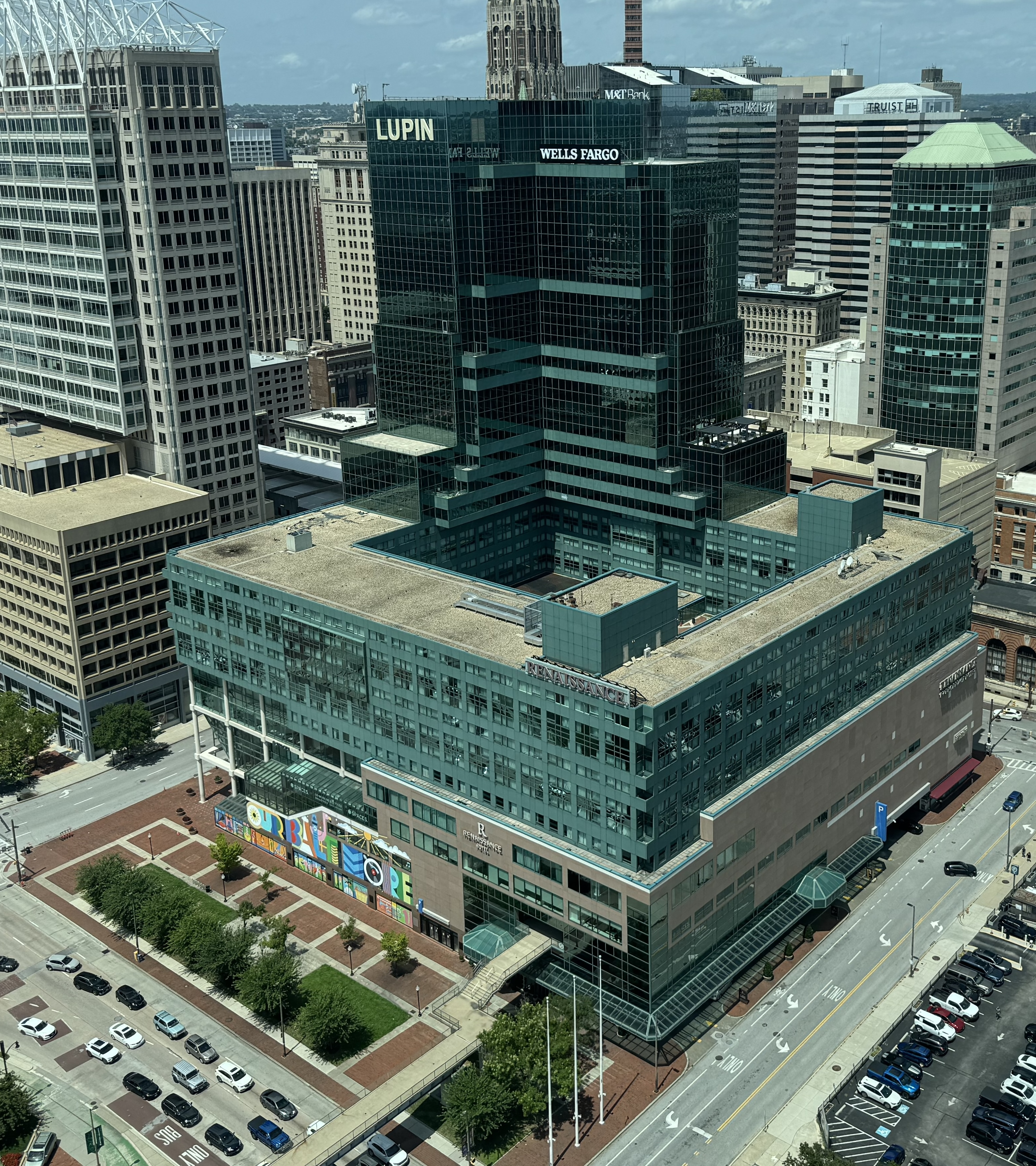
Exterior view (August 2024)

The Gallery at Harborplace was a once-bustling five-story mall and is adjacent to the Harborplace Tower and the Renaissance Baltimore Harborplace Hotel, designed with emerald green glass panels. The mall is situated at both Pratt and Calvert streets, while the tower and hotel is situated at Pratt, Calvert, and Lombard streets.

The mall featured traditional inline tenants as opposed to the local stalls in the pavilions, such as Forever 21, Starbucks, Gap & Gap Kids, and Bath & Body Works. Due to its vertical exterior design, the mall is without traditional senior anchors; its only junior anchor was Brooks Brothers, and is connected to the Pratt Street Pavilion via a skywalk on the second floor that has remained closed for years.

=== History ===
==== 1981–1997: Development, opening, Legg Mason leaves, hotel rebranding ====
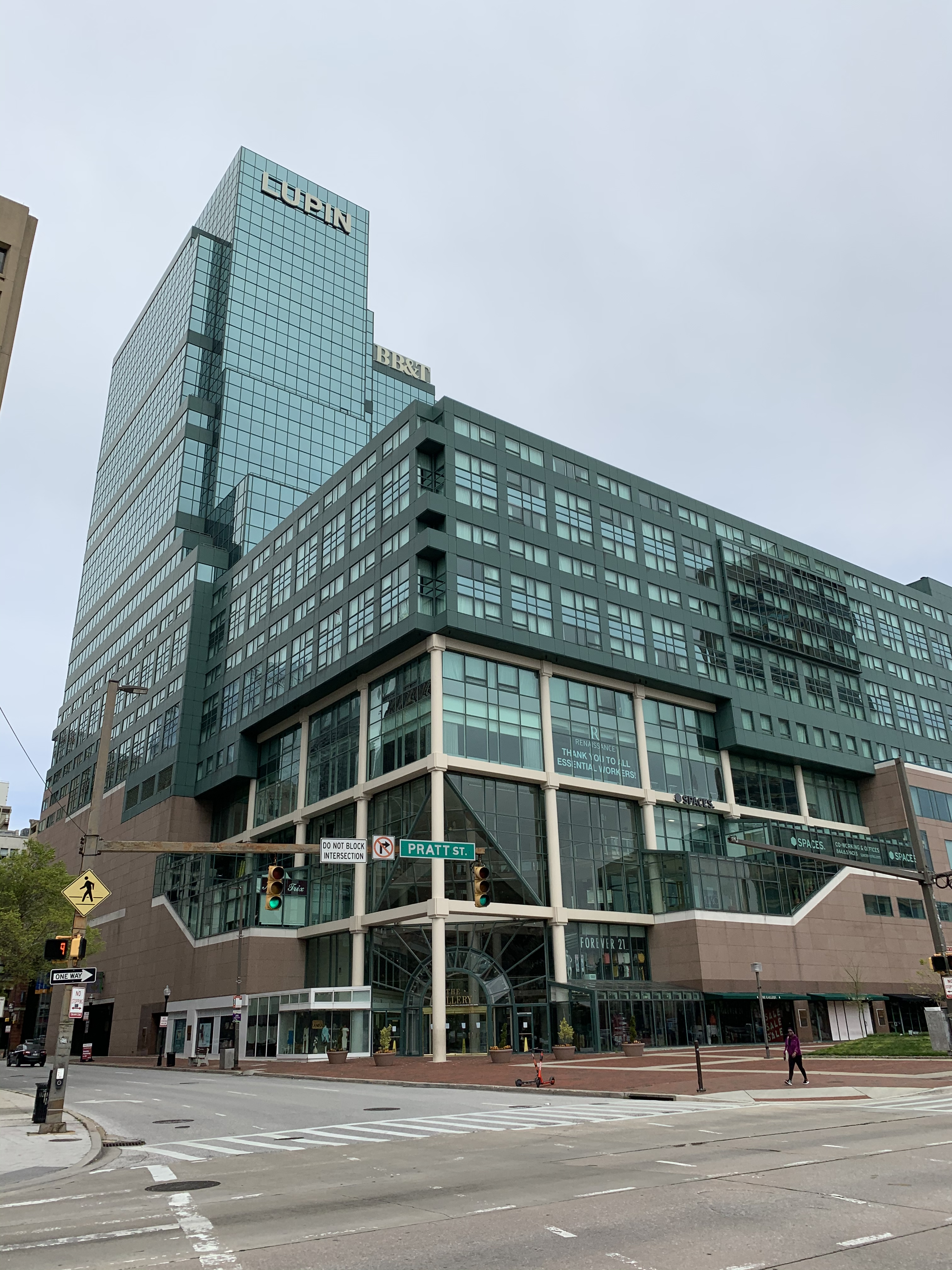
The mall's entrance on April 19, 2020, from the exterior

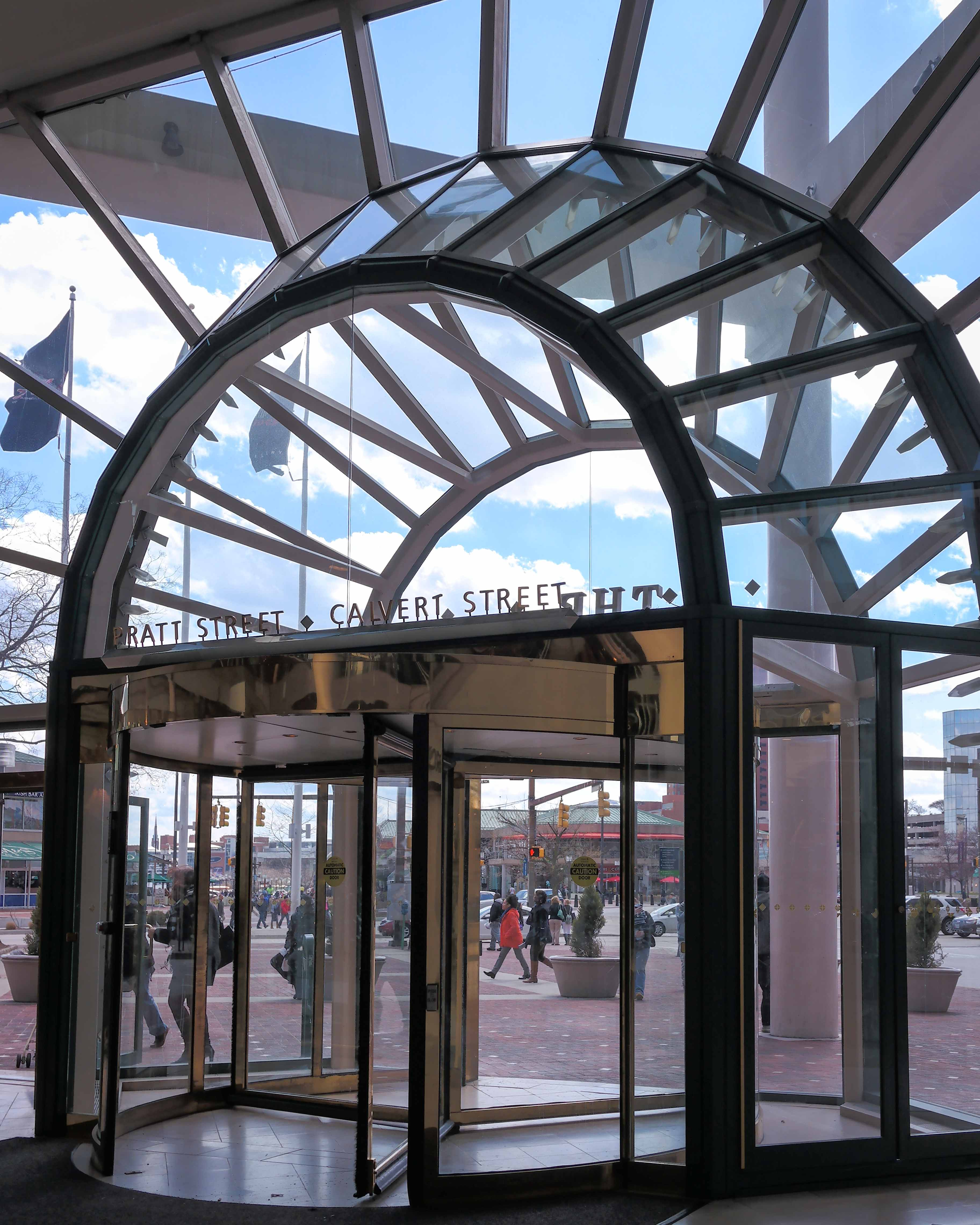
The mall's entrance on April 3, 2015, from the interior

In 1981, David S. Cordish was looking to develop a Bloomingdale's department store connected to a hotel near the pavilions; however, this plan ultimately fell through when the Rouse Company purchased a large city block that was once a parking lot in downtown Baltimore needed for Cordish's proposal. They were interested in revitalizing this area by opening a regional mall that would act as a Phase II expansion of the Harborplace complex, announcing that the mall would feature a 28-story office tower and a 12-story hotel which the city wanted to support the new convention circuits at the Baltimore Convention Center. Rouse hired architect Eberhard H. Zeidler to design the mall and the adjacent structures. Zeidler was already in discussions about the Inner Harbor in the mid-1970s, citing the Inner Harbor as a "desolate wasteland."

Zeidler and the Rouse team had the architectural plans drawn up and submitted them for approval. The new Gallery mall was announced to have five floors, with three floors of retail stores, with the third floor having a walkway that turned 180 degrees, giving access to a food court with windows overlooking the Inner Harbor, and there would also be a pair of escalators giving access to the fourth floor, which would be part of the hotel and entertainment area. All throughout the mall would be plants and shrubs taking in sunlight from the massive glass ceiling above the central atrium, with the fifth floor offering a view of The Gallery from above that atrium. The mall would be designed to have a diagonal cut right through the building, a center water display with a blue crab statue in the middle, and a spiral staircase.

Rouse hoped the new development would be enough to attract the New York-based Bloomingdale's to open in The Gallery. They signed a letter of intent, but the deal "fell apart in the corporate capital allocation" of its then-parent, Federated Department Stores (now Macy's Inc.). As a result, The Rouse Co. announced that Brooks Brothers would be The Gallery's only anchor. The Gallery began construction in 1985 and had its grand opening celebration on the afternoon of September 3, 1987, with a ceremonial cake cutting, festivals through September 7, and an Americana concert performance at 9:00 p.m. EDT, with original stores being Sharper Image, Banana Republic, Ann Taylor, and Gap & Gap Kids. A parking garage at 101 S. Calvert Street and 110 South Street, officially operating as the Premium Parking Lot (also known as Gallery Garage), would be designed to hold 1,150 cars, and opened earlier in June. Rouse hired the newly founded McNamara • Salvia for the structural engineer.

Harborplace Tower opened later in February 1988, with its anchor tenant being Legg Mason. Stouffer Harborplace Hotel followed in April of that year. Legg Mason relocated to the nearby 100 Light Street tower in 1997. The hotel was rebranded as a Renaissance property in 1998 following the retirement of the Stouffer brand after its acquisition by New World Development in 1993.

==== 2001 renovation ====
In the early 2000s, The Rouse Company announced a renovation for The Gallery to modernize it, with the intent to make it more competitive with newer shopping malls in Maryland. This included replacing the grand central staircases with escalators, and adding exterior entrances to ground-floor stores. The renovation was completed in 2001, and the mall has not been updated since then. By April 15, 2003, the mall featured the Disney Store and Talbots. That year, Lupin Pharmaceuticals took over a 3,000 sq ft (280 m^{2}) sublease in Harborplace Tower.

==== 2004–2022: Decline and closure of the Gallery mall, and renovations ====
After acquiring Rouse in 2004, GGP sold the Renaissance hotel to Sunstone Hotel Investors for $157 million the following year. The Baltimore Orioles debuted their new 2009 uniforms at The Gallery on November 12, 2008. Starbucks opened at The Gallery on December 31, 2008, after relocating from the pavilions.

Forever 21 announced in February 2010 that they would occupy the space that was formerly Borders Books & Music, which closed its doors after the chain went out of business in the U.S. The Limited also exited during this decade, and Sharper Image shuttered its storefront starting in June 2008 after filing for Chapter 11 bankruptcy, leading to liquidation of all 86 remaining store locations. In July 2009, J.Crew and Aveda would close their doors because they simultaneously declined renewal of their leases. Immediately after that announcement, Origins and White House Black Market also vacated. BB&T Corporation would expand its space in Harborplace Tower in August 2011, alongside a deal for the naming rights.

On June 26, 2013, Lupin Pharmaceuticals signed a massive lease expansion to double its footprint in Harborplace Tower to 34,432 sq ft (3,198.8 m^{2}) across two full floors. The firm secured the naming rights to put its logo on the top of the building in April 2014 to establish brand awareness. Tim Jackson explained that for CEO Vinita Gupta, who owned a personal condominium in the Inner Harbor, to wake up every morning, look out of the window, and see her company's logo lit up on the Baltimore skyline was "important to them". In January 2015, Wet Seal announced the closure of its Gallery at Harborplace location because the company was in the process of liquidating all its stores after filing for Chapter 11 bankruptcy. In January 2016, GGP gave some of the mall's tenants 30-day notices to vacate to allow for renovations. This included Krazi Kebab, which opened in 2013, The Dollar Store, and Ann Taylor. In March 2016, Brooks Brothers closed its Gallery at Harborplace location because the company announced that it was relocating to Harbor East. On May 17 of that year, GGP put The Gallery up for sale again. The Renaissance hotel completed a $4.5 million renovation on June 10 of that year, which updated its meeting, dining, and event spaces. On June 23, GGP announced that they would remove the escalators that gave access to the fifth floor and the hotel, as the mall's food court on the fourth level would be converted into a coworking place called Spaces, which was completed in July 2016. Banana Republic announced in early October of that year that they would relocate from The Gallery at Harborplace to the Harborplace pavilions, which were in the process of renovation. This move was completed in 2018.

Following New York-based Brookfield Property Partners' acquisition of GGP Inc., all of its properties, including The Gallery and the Harborplace Tower, were transitioned to Brookfield Properties in August 2018. Starbucks permanently closed its Gallery location on December 26, 2018. Bunzzz Sports Bar & Grill opened in the former Brooks Brothers space on January 10, 2019. Gap & Gap Kids closed permanently in May 2019. In August 2019, a multi-million dollar renovation on the Renaissance hotel's guest rooms was completed. Johnston & Murphy and Bunzzz Sports Bar & Grill closed in February 2020.

The mall's decline was significantly exacerbated by the COVID-19 pandemic in March 2020, which also increased the rise of e-commerce and affected individual tenants, with Victoria's Secret closing as part of a nationwide plan to shut down 250 stores. The pandemic also caused financial problems, putting The Gallery on a national mortgage watchlist in June 2021. What also harmed the mall's reputation was that on May 30, 2020, vandals smashed the glass windows and doors of The Gallery and the Harborplace pavilions as part of a protest of the murdering of George Floyd, causing severe damage to multiple storefronts. Agitators separated from the main protest crowd, throwing objects at police officers and properties in the Inner Harbor. The Baltimore Police Department reported destruction of property at eight separate locations and burglaries at 11 locations that night. Officials also deployed tactical officers to secure the area, resulting in 14 arrests for burglary and destruction of property. Following this, the damaged areas were temporarily boarded up with lumber. The Buccini/Pollin Group (BPG) and PM Hotel Group acquired the Renaissance hotel for $80 million in July 2020.

After BB&T merged with SunTrust Banks, Inc. to form Truist in December 2019, their Harborplace Tower branch closed permanently in October 2021 to move to the 120 E. Baltimore Street tower. In September 2021, Brookfield Properties began ceasing operations of the mall by telling the remaining tenants that they have to vacate the mall by the end of the year. This led to the closures of Sunglass Hut, GNC, The Children's Place, and Aldo in the late 2021 period. Brookfield Properties released the following statement on September 23, in response to The Gallery's future after it closes:

We are currently evaluating several potential options to re-position The Gallery that will meet the needs of the market.

— Brookfield Properties Retail Group

Despite releasing this quote on WBAL-TV 11 News, Brookfield has been largely focused on the Harborplace Tower rather than revitalizing The Gallery. By January 2022, the mall was fully vacant, and later permanently closed and locked up from the public. The tower undergone a $12 million renovation that year, which involved upgrades to the lobby, a new fitness center, and "Move-in ready" suites, which was planned by Brookfield, and completed by Rand Construction Corporation.

==== 2023–present: Our Baltimore mural, receivership of Renaissance Hotel ====
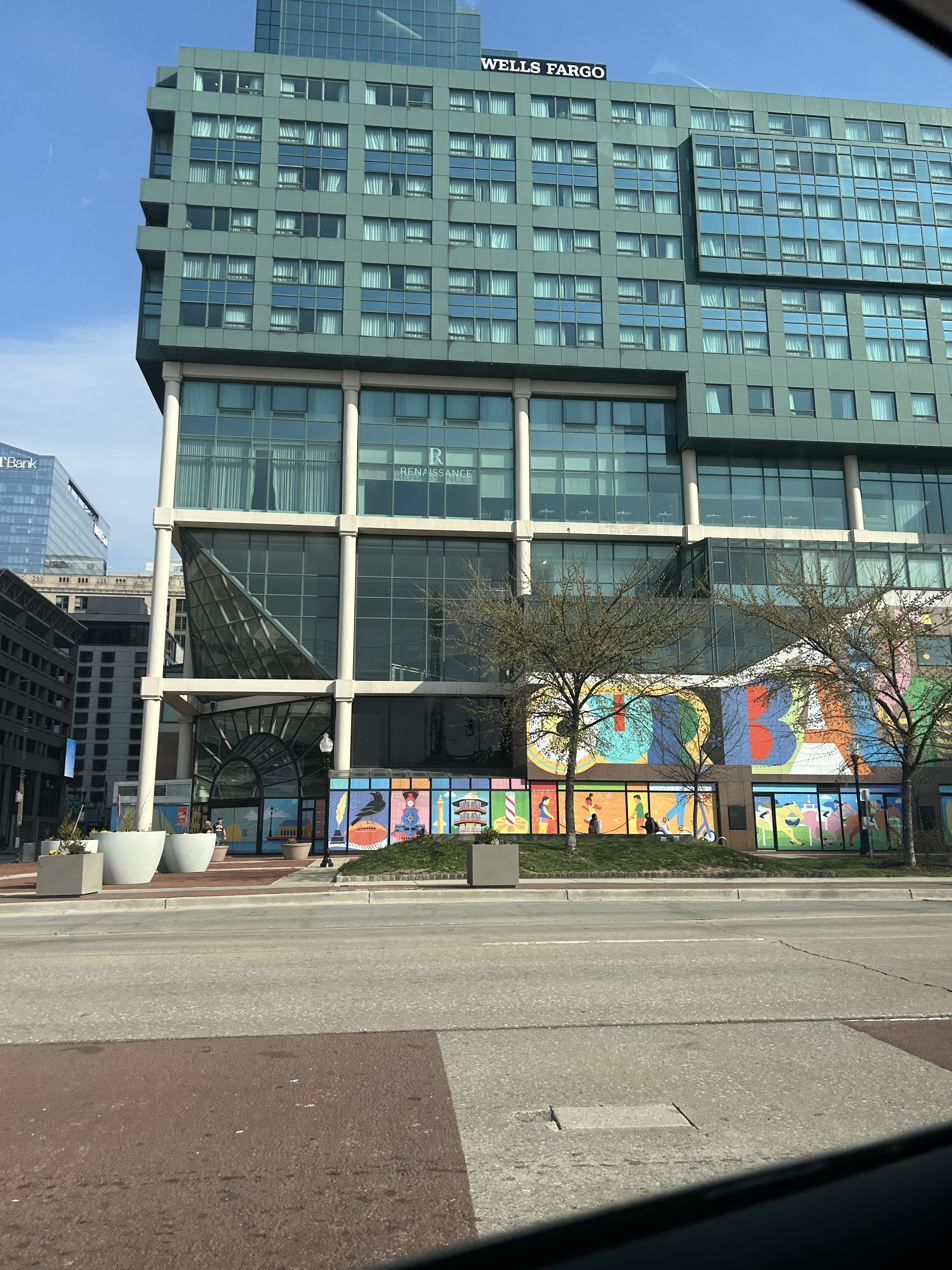
The Our Baltimore mural on the defunct Gallery mall (March 2026)

In early April 2023, Brookfield Properties announced that they would paint a mural titled Our Baltimore over the windows and entrance to the former Gallery to cover up the interior of the defunct mall from public view, and to revitalize the surrounding area. In late January 2024, Harborplace Tower's management was taken over by the CBRE Group following a partnership with Brookfield Properties. Wells Fargo opened in the former BB&T space, and later added their signage to the building in September 2024, leading to Harborplace Tower's new nickname, "Wells Fargo Tower".

In the fall of 2025, the owners of the Renaissance hotel defaulted on a $71 million loan, and the hotel was then formerly managed by GF Hotels & Resorts, a subsidiary of GF Hospitality BHMD Associates LLC, a court-appointed receiver. After the default, the hotel went into receivership in December 2025 following years of mismanagement such as elevator failures, non-functional escalators, and boiler breakdowns, which led to broken air-conditioning systems and the termination of its relationship with Marriott International's internal sales program. First reported on February 25, 2026, by the Baltimore Business Journal, The Baltimore Sun, and several other news outlets, the Harborplace hotel was announced to be put on foreclosure auction by Atlantic Auctions, Inc. on March 11, 2026. On March 11, 2026, the New York-based Torchlight Investors, a lender, became the new operator for the hotel. The firm acquired the building for $30 million.

== Photo gallery ==
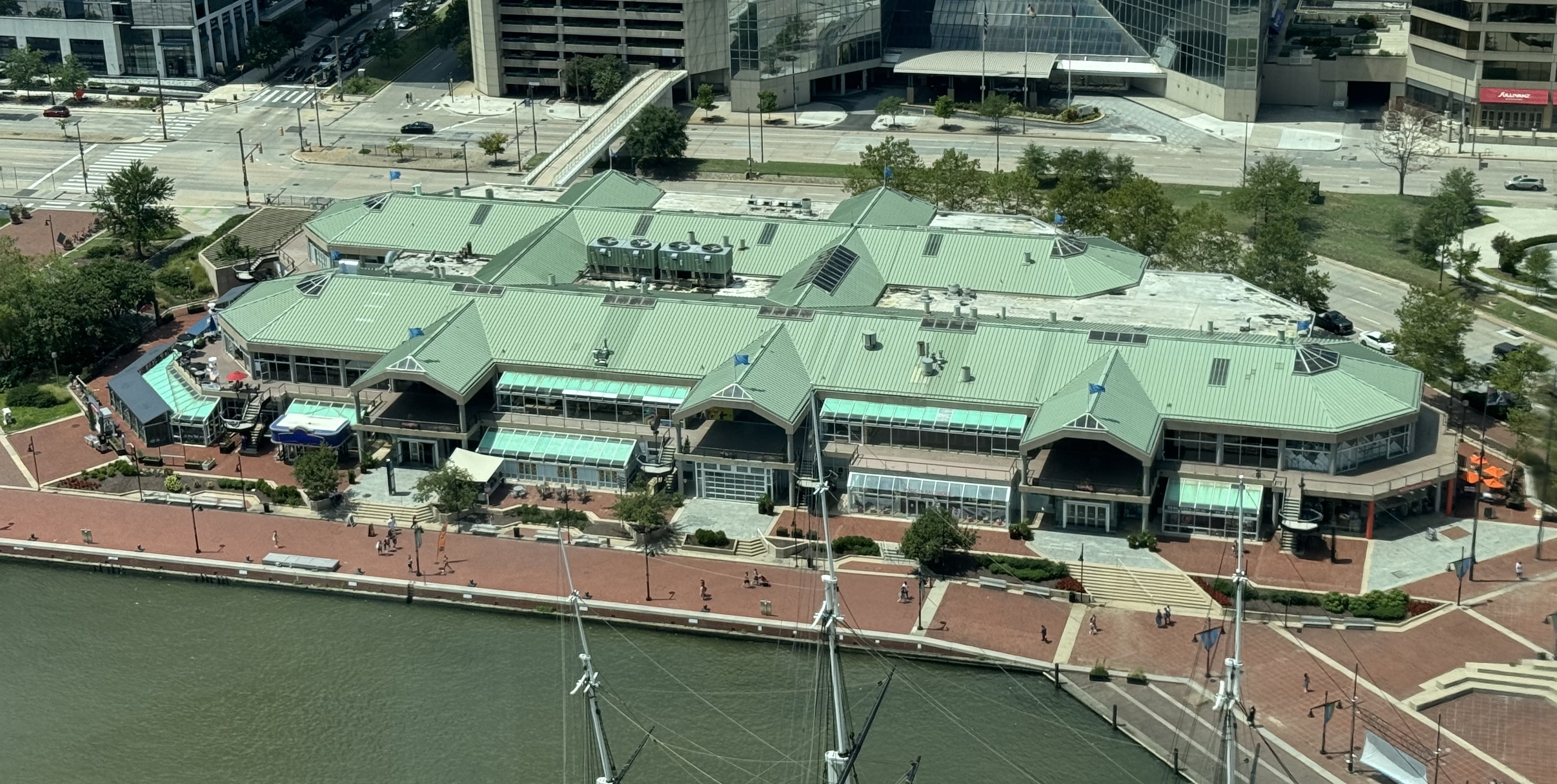
The Light Street Pavilion on August 3, 2024, as viewed from the World Trade Center

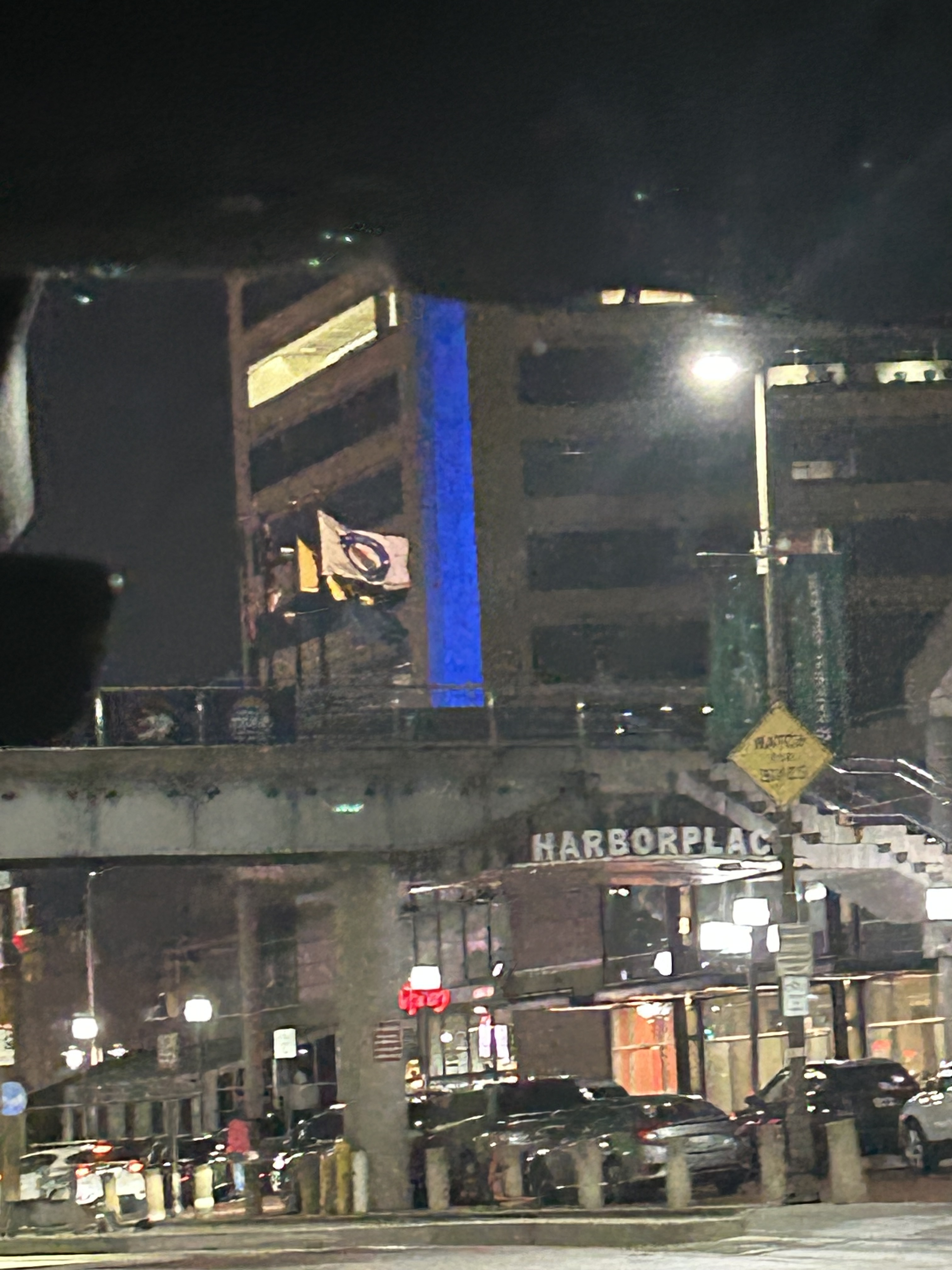
The closed Pratt Street skywalk at night (January 2026)

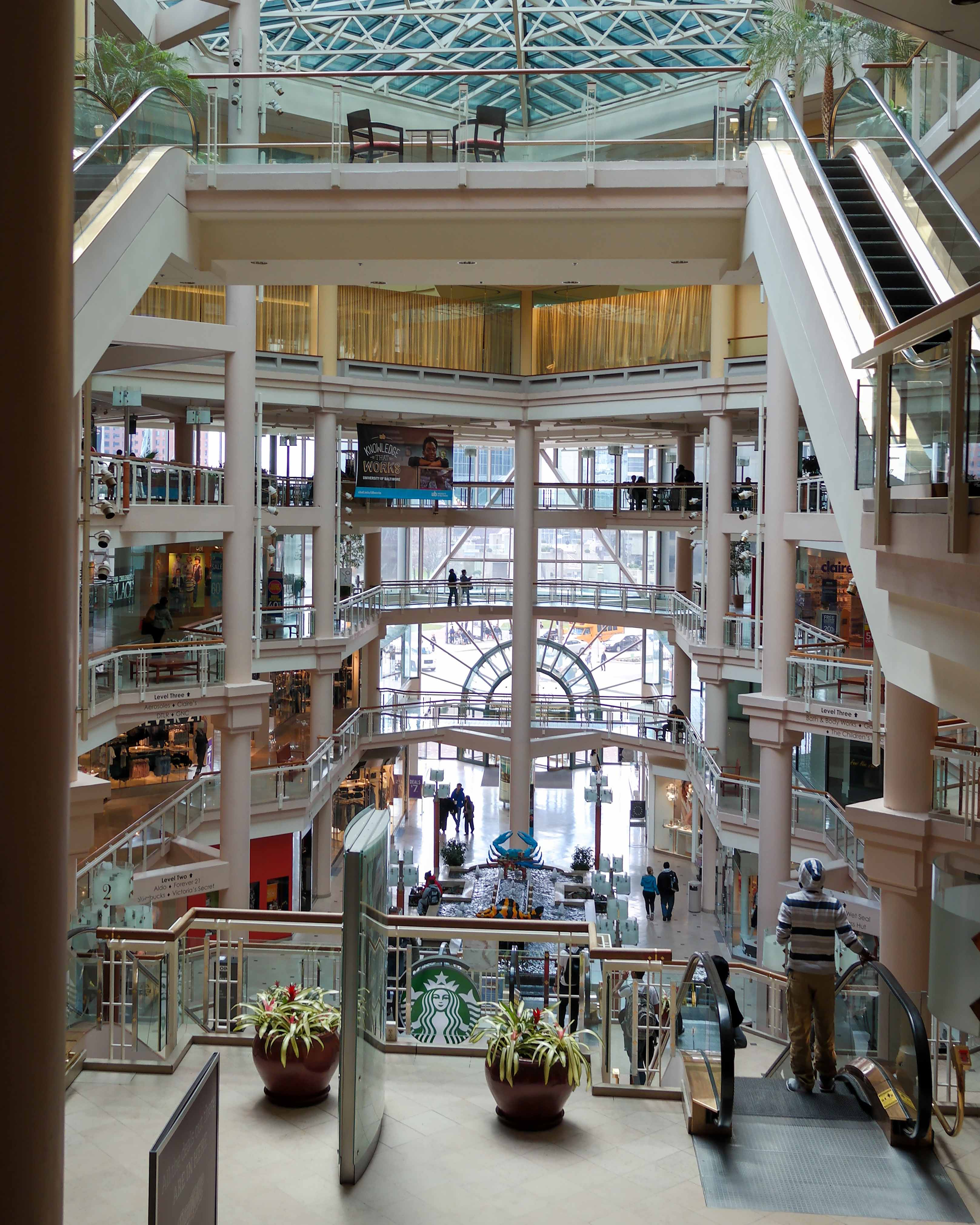
The Gallery interior (April 3, 2015)

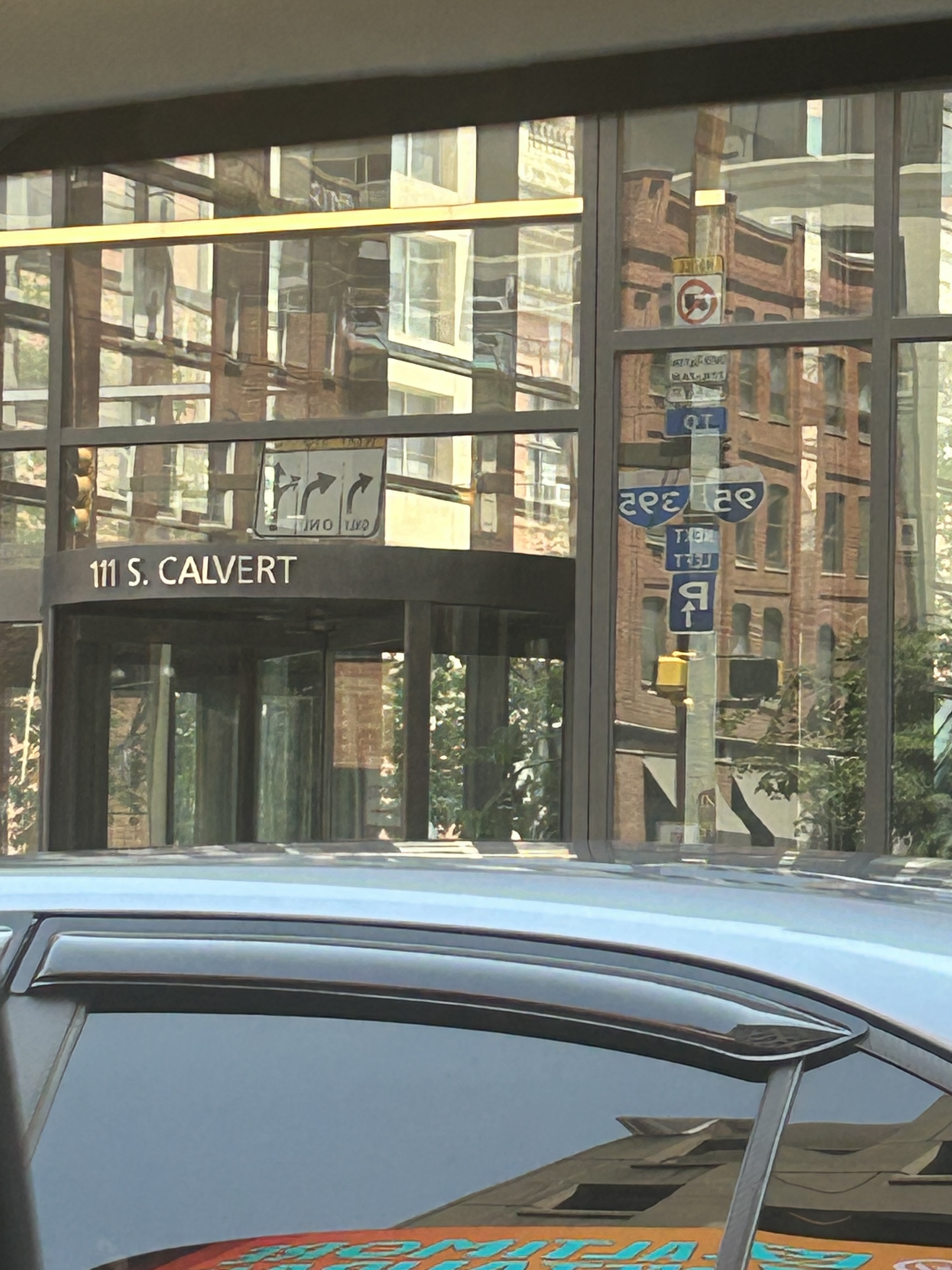
Harborplace Tower entrance (July 2026)

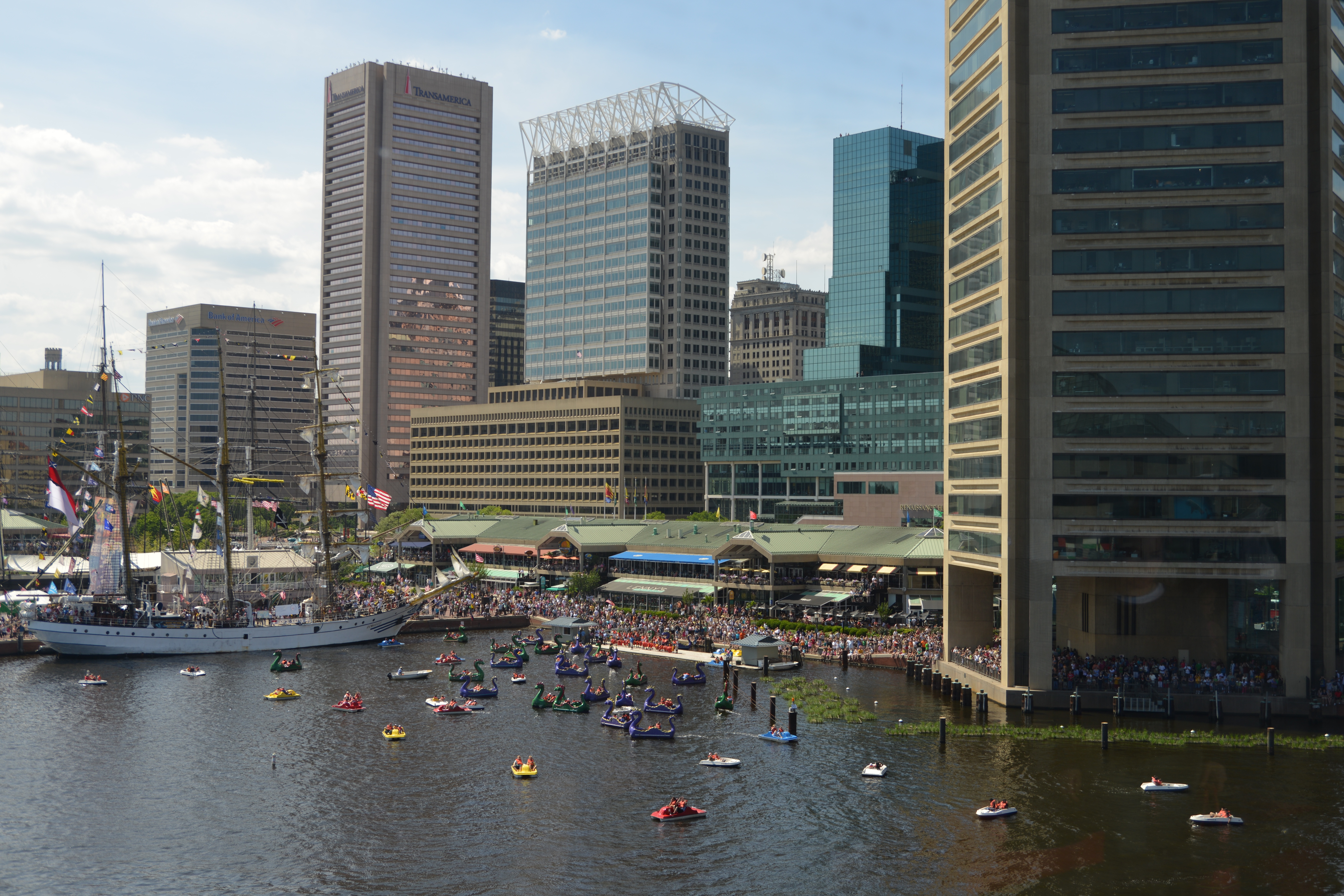
Harborplace in June 2012

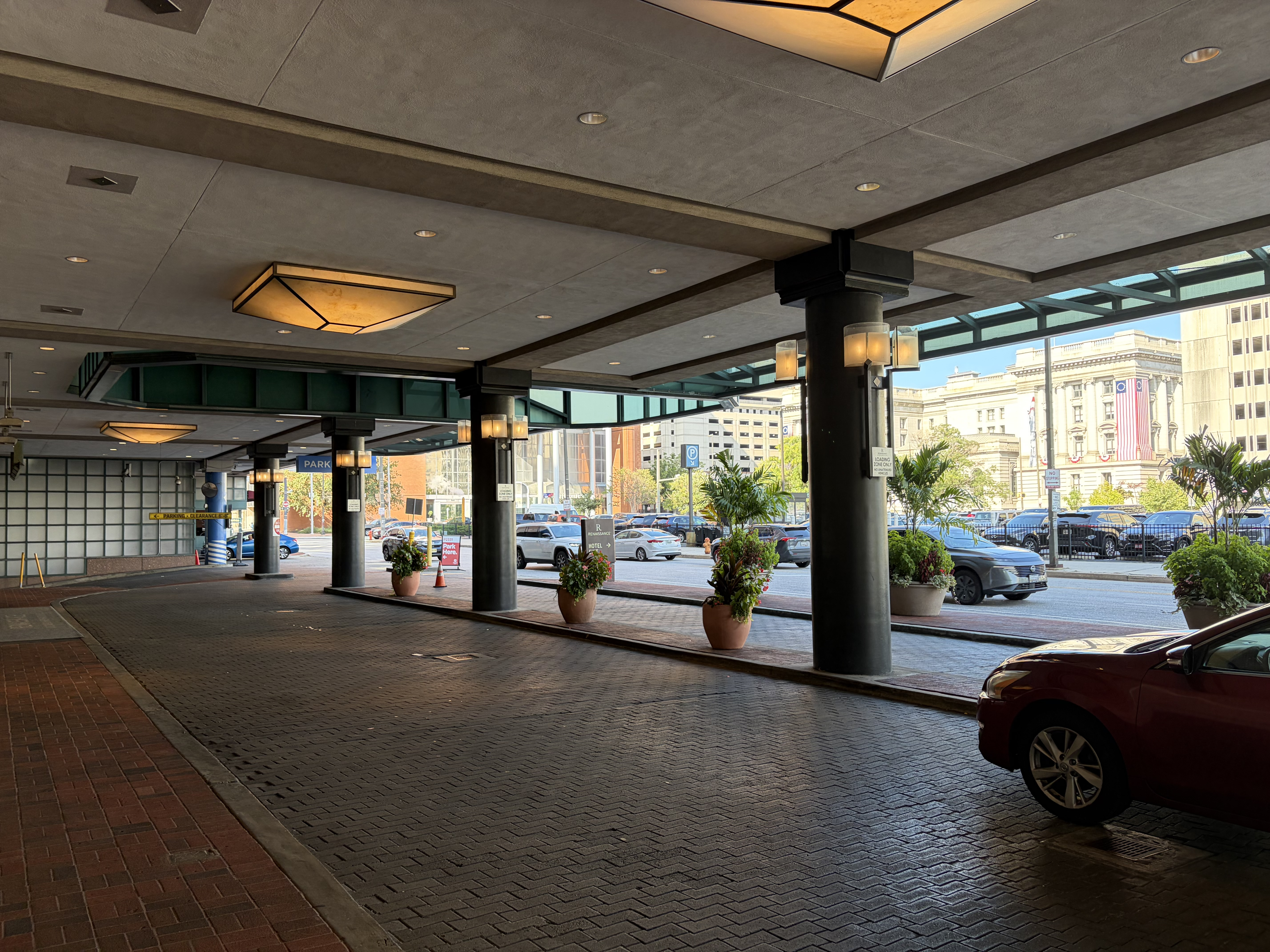
Parking and entrance area at the Renaissance Baltimore Harborplace Hotel (August 2026)

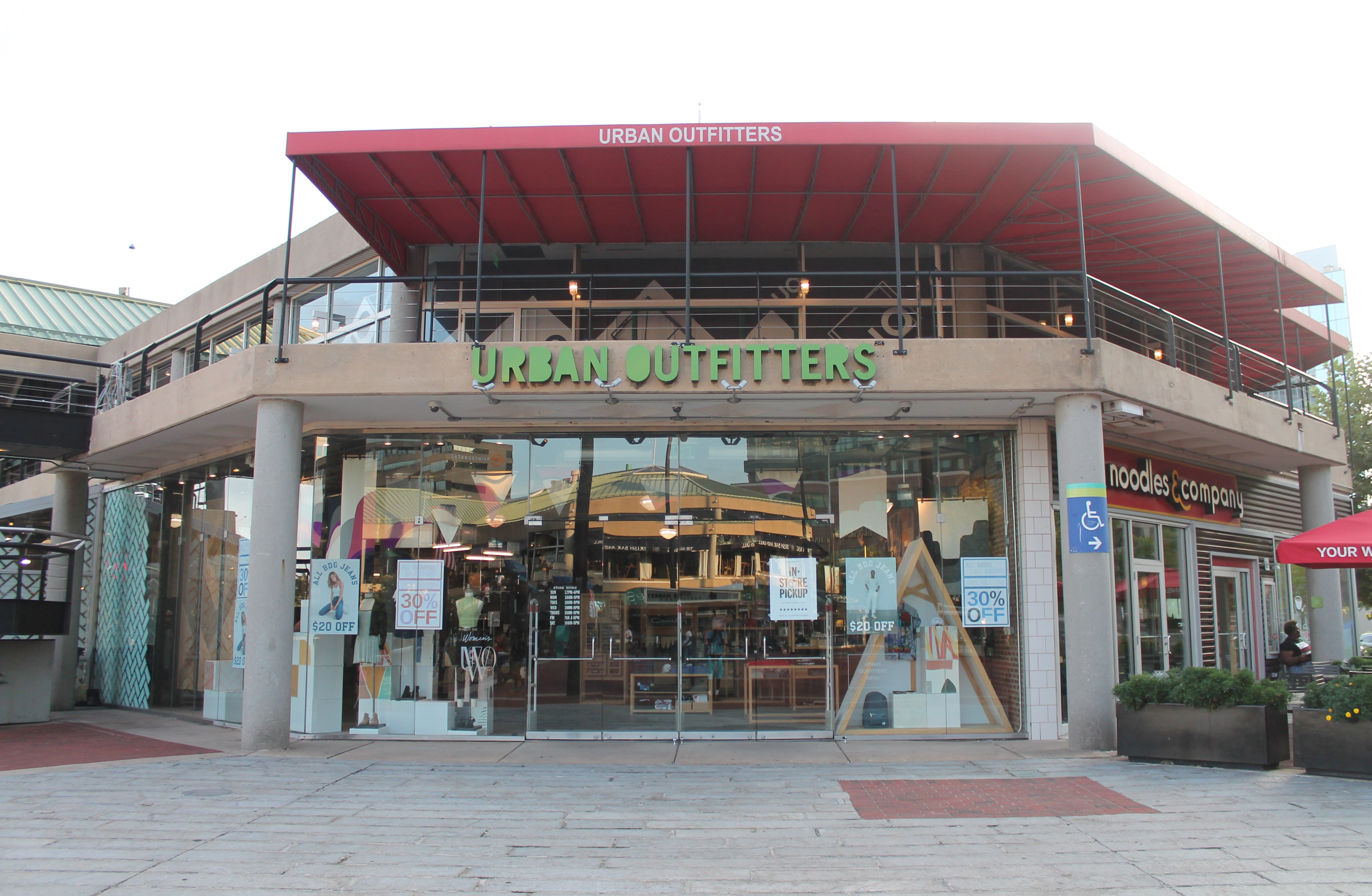
Urban Outfitters (center) and Noodles & Co. (right) - August 2016

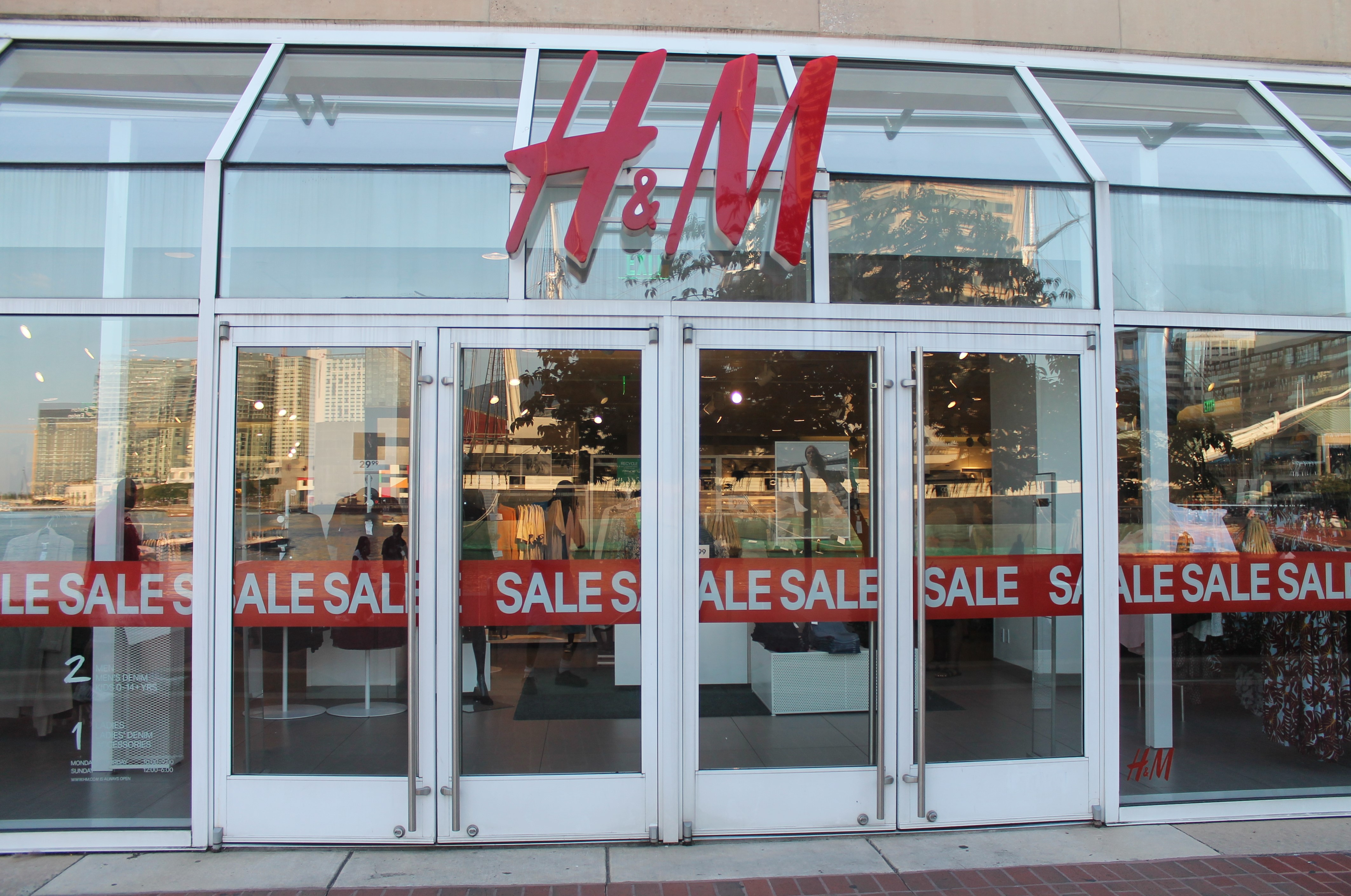
H&M (August 2016)

== See also ==
- Jacksonville Landing—a similarly failed festival marketplace developed by The Rouse Company in Downtown Jacksonville, Florida
- Harbourside Shopping Centre, which was directly inspired by Harborplace and had James W. Rouse involved, in Sydney, New South Wales, Australia
- Port Discovery (museum), which shares architecture with Harborplace and was also developed by Rouse in collaboration with Walt Disney Imagineering
- The Brokerage, Fishmarket Mall and UA The Movies at Harbor Park
