= 6th Street Marketplace =

Abandoned mall in Richmond, Virginia, U.S.

Sixth Street Marketplace

- The abandoned Crystal Palace food court (left) and Blues Armory (close to center, April 2015)
- Location: Richmond, Virginia, U.S.
- Address: 6 N. 6th Street and 9 S. 6th Street, 23219
- Opened: September 18, 1985; 41 years ago
- Renovated: Early 2004 (Crystal Palace only)
- Closed: September 2003; 23 years ago (shopping mall); May 12, 2008; 18 years ago (Crystal Palace)
- Demolished: October 25, 2003 – around 2004 (6th Street Marketplace); June 12, 2004 (former Thalhimers)
- Developer: James W. Rouse and the Enterprise Development Co.
- Manager: Richmond Redevelopment and Housing Authority
- Owner: Richmond Redevelopment and Housing Authority
- Architect: Marcellus Wright, Cox & Smith; Mort Hoppenfeld
- Num. of stores: 71 (at peak)
- Num. of anchor tenants: 2 (at peak)
- Floor area: 176,000 square feet (16,400 m^{2})
- Floors: 2 (5 in Crystal Palace)
- Parking: Parking garage with 5,500 paid spaces
- Website: Official website at the Wayback Machine (archived March 27, 2004)
- Building details

General information
- Status: Undergoing redevelopment
- Construction started: April 8, 1984; 42 years ago
- Completed: 1985

Renovating team
- Renovating firm: City of Richmond

The 6th Street Marketplace (or Sixth Street Marketplace) was a festival marketplace in downtown Richmond, Virginia, United States, that has failed to revitalize the city due to a poor layout and location. The mall opened in September 1985, closed permanently in September 2003 and was demolished in 2004, with only the food court structure remaining, but as of May 2008, has also been closed and boarded up, and as of 2021, slated for demolition. It was planned to be renamed to The Shops at City Square, though those plans were abandoned by the late 1990s.

The mall was anchored by Miller & Rhoads and the flagship Thalhimers, which both closed in the early 1990s after being acquired by May Department Stores. 6th Street Marketplace was developed as a public-private partnership involving James W. Rouse of the Enterprise Development Company, a for-profit subsidiary of the non-profit Enterprise Foundation. The Rouse Company of Columbia, Maryland was also involved.

== History ==
=== 1974–1985: Development and opening ===
In 1974, the Richmond City Council established a commission to study the revitalization of the central business district. This marked the official start of planning efforts. In January 1976, the commission submitted its formal plan, which identified the future site of the marketplace as "Project One", marking it as the top priority for redevelopment in the city to bring people back to Richmond and compete with suburban shopping malls. In 1977, the master plan for a new 6th Street Marketplace was first approved during the mayoral term of Henry L. Marsh III. The project was built on the site of a traditional outdoor/indoor market that had thrived for decades selling produce and poultry. This area was part of the broader Navy Hill neighborhood, which was largely cleared in earlier decades for highway expansion and urban renewal projects.

The project was a collaboration between the City of Richmond and Richmond Renaissance, a civic group formed to encourage downtown redevelopment. James W. Rouse and his newly-founded Enterprise Development Company (EDC), which also was in the process of developing Norfolk's Waterside in Virginia, was selected for the project in 1982. The EDC was founded in 1982 after Rouse retired from the Rouse Company of Columbia, Maryland as CEO in 1979, and it was for to bring the festival marketplace concept, previously used for Faneuil Hall Marketplace in Boston, Massachusetts, and Harborplace in Baltimore, in smaller cities. The EDC selected the local architectural firm Marcellus Wright, Cox & Smith to design the marketplace. The design involved making the marketplace adjacent to the former Blues Armory building and the Richmond Coliseum arena, a massive, lighted pedestrian bridge known as the Renaissance Court and a large, "airy, soaring conservatory-like structure" food court known as the Crystal Palace. The $25 million project broke ground on April 8, 1984.

The EDC founded the legal affiliate Rouse-Richmond, Inc., and later Richmond Festival Marketplace Partnership, for 6th Street Marketplace's development. 6th Street Marketplace held a soft opening on May 3, 1985, revealing its first 11 tenants, while it officially had its grand opening on September 18, 1985, featuring specialty shops, public space, and two competing, historic anchor stores: Miller & Rhoads and Thalhimers. A portion of the former Blues Armory was converted into a retail and restaurant space as part of the marketplace. The grand opening involved a balloon release, and was filled with music from various groups, including multiple bagpipe bands that paraded through the area. Concerts also would take place inside of the mall, and at the time of the grand opening, 6th Street Marketplace was filled with 53 stores and restaurants. James Rouse envisioned the marketplace as a "bridge between the black and white communities". At its 1985 grand opening, leaders hailed it as a "guarantee for another 143 years." Rouse expected 3.5 to 4 million people would visit the mall annually, bringing in $18 million, and city consultants projected a $6.5 million profit over the next 20 years.

=== 1985–2008: Decline, closure, and demolition ===
While 6th Street Marketplace's grand opening successfully attracted multiple visitors, and people thought that it would be a great solution to bring people back to Richmond, multiple flaws quickly stripped the mall out of that status and debunked such optimistic claims. Most particularly, Richmond did not have a lot of tourism. A few hours after the marketplace opened, it immediately began to struggle to attract more visitors and traffic, particularly after 5:00 p.m. local time.

In 1986, the marketplace lost $1.3 million in just one year in operation, and it also failed to deliver what the city and the EDC expected for the marketplace. The marketplace was also reported to have maintenance flaws, particularly a poorly-designed HVAC system that eventually failed, leading tenants to complain that the lack of air conditioning would "freeze out clients" in the winter and would feel "extremely hot" during the summer months. Legal concerns arose over inadequate smoke detectors and a lack of necessary safety infrastructure after a false fire alarm in January 1986. The EDC also failed to meet financial expectations the same year. The marketplace also struggled due to its poor exterior design; the food court and the shopping buildings were separated into the north and south sides, connected by a massive pedestrian bridge above Broad Street, causing visibility and accessibility issues. A major MIT study claimed the mall James Rouse built on the site was an "inefficient and inflexible building" that was unable to adjust to the actual customer profile of the location. Additionally, the five-story Crystal Palace glass atrium building was difficult to navigate. The two-story Palm Court building was designed to house luxury stores.

The design created large commercial blocks that disrupted the traditional, shorter street grid of downtown Richmond. Critics later argued that this design choice worked against good urban planning principles and removed healthy competition between the anchor stores. The chosen site "presented economic and psychological barriers to potential visitors" and did not complement the marketplace well. The design failed to adequately connect the Black and white communities it intended to bridge, leading to a mismatched customer base. The flawed architectural choices led to constant, costly maintenance issues and building code violations, which fueled upcoming tenant lawsuits. The parking areas were often described as difficult and inconvenient, contributing to a lack of customer traffic. By March 1987, at least nine tenants had left the mall, dropping the mall's 71 tenants at its peak of expansion to just 62. In October 1987, 16 stores moved out of the mall, and nine of them had begun suing the city and the Enterprise Development Company for breach of contract, citing that both of them had misrepresented the level of marketing and promotional support it would provide to drive customer traffic, and the broken HVAC system made operating their businesses difficult and uncomfortable for customers. Three stores had planned to move into the mall in this period, being The Chicken Coop, Sidney's, and Everything's A Dollar. 6th Street Marketplace was 81% occupied at the time, and James Rouse was confident that the mall would hit 100% occupancy soon. However, when news reporters asked him when that would happen, he stated that he couldn't predict.

After the lawsuits and financial failures, The Rouse Company announced that year that they would not build anymore festival marketplaces. James Rouse later admitted that he was unaware of the specific demographics required for struggling cities, including Richmond, Toledo, and Flint. In fact, even the main Rouse Company festival marketplaces began struggling for their first few years, such as the South Street Seaport in Manhattan, New York City, and Bayside Marketplace in Miami, Florida, forcing the company to shift from local vendors to national chains. Riverwalk Marketplace in New Orleans, Louisiana and Jacksonville Landing in Jacksonville, Florida were reported by the firm as unprofitable. The problems got to a boiling point when in 1988, the City of Richmond effectively asked James Rouse and the EDC to leave as the managing partner due to ongoing financial failures, maintenance issues, and an inability to revitalize the downtown core. The EDC also pulled out of two more struggling festival marketplaces due to heavy operating deficits around this time, being the Water Street Pavilion in Flint, Michigan and Portside Festival Marketplace in Toledo, Ohio. By February 1988, 6th Street Marketplace was 78% leased, with only 47 tenants remaining. The city hired local firm Goodman Segar Hogan Inc. to handle management of the mall.

By the summer of 1989, 6th Street Marketplace had 37 tenants remaining, with only 23 being the mall's original tenants from its 1985 opening. Caswell-Massey closed in December 1989. Goodman Segar Hogan noted that the HVAC system was only 80% efficient to continue operation, focusing on correcting it. They also had to repair a leaking roof inside the Crystal Palace food court. A major "final blow" for the mall occurred in the 1990s, when the marketplace lost both of its department stores. Miller & Rhoads filed for bankruptcy, was acquired by the May Department Stores Company, and closed permanently in February 1990. Thalhimers was also acquired by May Department Stores, which closed the downtown flagship store on January 22, 1992. This left 6th Street Marketplace with no traditional anchors, further decreasing traffic and customers.

This also led to the city to plan on transforming 6th Street Marketplace into a traditional shopping mall, and it would be renamed to The Shops at City Square, aiming on revitalizing signage and infrastructure by the fall. However, this also failed to revitalize the dying mall. The floor of the mall's entrance was cleaned by local firefighters on March 9, 2000, after a transformer explosion. On July 8, 2002, the Richmond City Council announced that the mall would be demolished, and began notifying the remaining tenants that the mall would be permanently closed and razed by early September 2003. During this time, deteriorating conditions persisted, including a damaged electrical outlet in the food court that remained unaddressed. In the summer of that year, they gave the final four tenants two options to take the payout and relocate on their own, or the city would pay for moving fees and reestablishment. Three took the payout, but the others struggled to find new locations. The marketplace officially closed its doors in September 2003, and demolition began on October 25, when the main pedestrian bridge was finally torn down.

Thalhimers demolition (December 2004)

Demolition was completed in 2004, with only the Crystal Palace building remaining in operation due to its connection to the Blues Armory, which initially made demolition of that building challenging due to the Blues Armory being in the National Register of Historic Places (NRHP). Demolition on the former Thalhimers building began immediately after. The food court was also renovated in early 2004, after tenants reported even more maintenance issues, such as:

- A consistent, leaking roof, which has frequently returned despite several repairs.
- Crumbling ceilings.
- Rodent infestations.
- Mechanical and electrical failures, which were also a fire hazard.

The food court closed permanently on May 12, 2008, temporarily serving strictly as a walkway to the Richmond Coliseum until its entrances were ultimately boarded up with lumber after vandals tagged the building with graffiti. Tenants for the food court were announced to leave the building by August 9, 2007, but the deadline was extended to May 12, 2008. The last tenant notable for leaving when the food court closed is Captain Sam's Seafood. Ever since its closure in 2008, the space has fallen into severe disrepair, including mold growth, rodent infestations, and vandalism.

=== Redevelopment ===
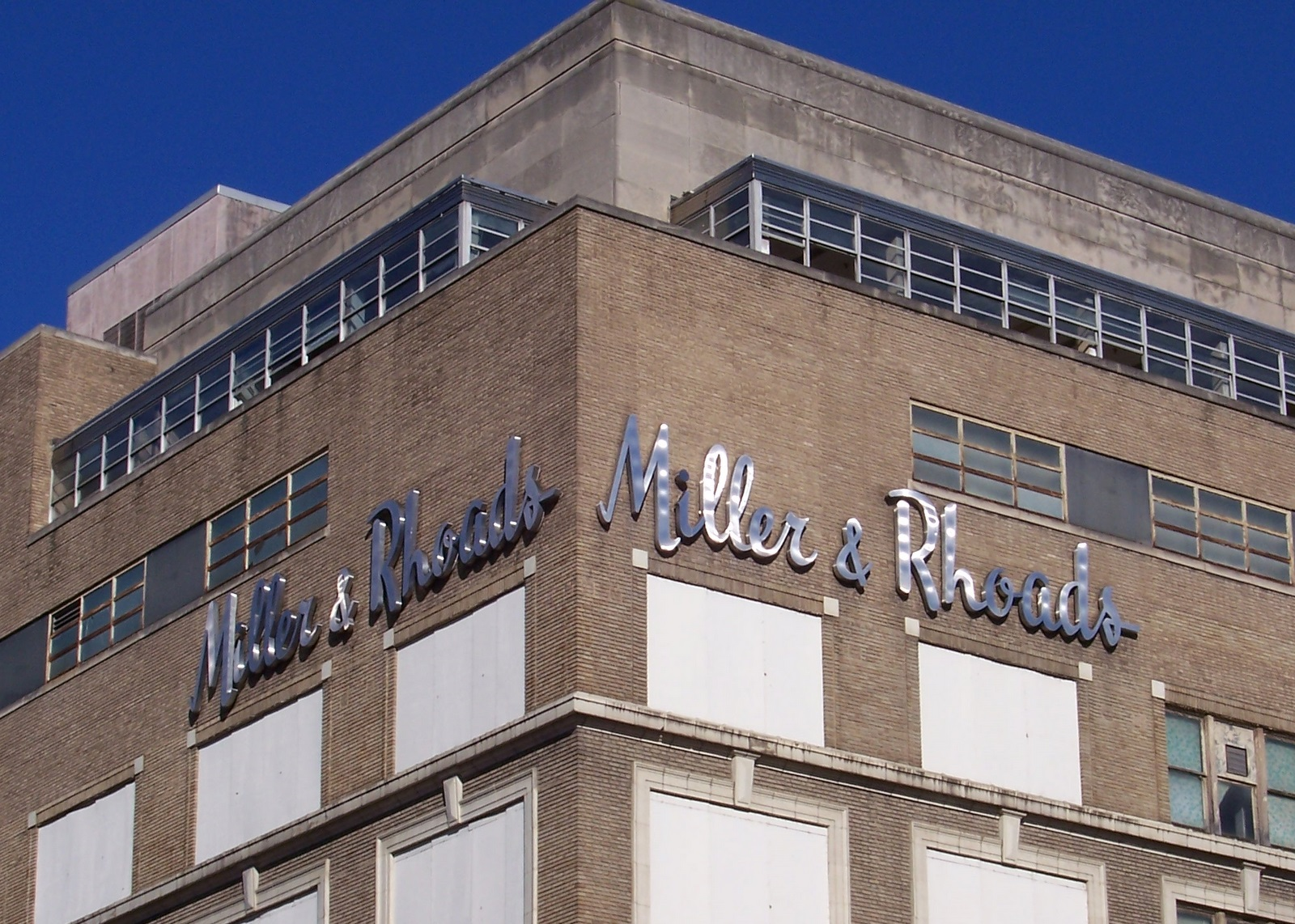
Former Miller & Rhoads (December 2004)

The former site of Thalhimers was used for an expansion of the adjacent Richmond CenterStage (now Dominion Energy Center) which opened around September 2009, while the Miller & Rhoads building was converted into a Hilton Garden Inn (now the Hilton Richmond Downtown hotel), which opened in February 2010. 6th Street Marketplace, the Blues Armory, and the Richmond Coliseum are all abandoned as of 2019. The site will be redeveloped into a mixed-use district called City Center Innovation District, which involves demolition of the Richmond Coliseum, which has been closed and abandoned since 2019. The redevelopment plan was announced in 2021.

The City of Richmond's Economic Development Authority (EDA) has been soliciting five proposals sent from developers in December 2022 to purchase and redevelop the 9.4-acre (3.8 ha) site, and it involves adaptive reuse of historic structures like the Blues Armory, new streetscapes, housing, and improved pedestrian access. The City Center redevelopment aims to create a vibrant, walkable urban area, learning from past mistakes to build a sustainable downtown destination. The last remaining remnant of the original 6th Street Marketplace, being the northern food court building, will also be razed.

The plan also involves building a 500-room convention hotel, hundreds of housing units, and a new 10-bay GRTC transit hub. Housing and retail will include 700 and 1,100 residential units and roughly 28,000 square feet (2,600 m^{2}) of ground-floor retail. In late October 2025, the Greater Richmond Convention Center Authority (GRCCA) began pursuing updated cost estimates and environmental studies to prepare for the teardown of the Coliseum.

Beginning in January 2026, the City of Richmond is taking steps to prepare for the demolition of Crystal Palace and the Coliseum. Angie Rodgers, director of the Economic Development Authority, released the following statement on January 21:

We want to make sure that we are clear between us as partners what our roles and responsibilities are, but we keep moving in a quick manner. We're going to focus on policy and demolition.

— Angie Rodgers, director of the EDA

On June 1, 2026, the timeline was aggressively updated. The main priority pushed by Mayor Danny Avula was to tear down the Coliseum and the food court by "this year." A $15 million state funding package was allocated specifically to cover the city's demolition and site preparation costs. The timeline was also altered to separate it from the parallel Greater Richmond Transit Company (GRTC) plans for the Downtown Transfer Hub at the nearby former Public Safety Building site.

== See also ==
- Rainbow Centre Factory Outlet in Niagara Falls, New York, which had a similar failure
- The Shops at National Place in Washington, D.C.
- Les Terrasses in Montreal, Quebec, Canada
