= Mort Hoppenfeld =

American urban planner (1929–1985)

- Born: February 18, 1929
- Died: March 26, 1985; Columbia, Maryland, US
- Education: Berkeley
- Occupation: Urban Planner
- Employer(s): The Rouse Company and The Enterprise Development Company

Morton Hoppenfeld (February 18, 1929 – March 26, 1985) was an American urban planner who worked for the Rouse Company on the development of the Village of Cross Keys in Columbia, Maryland, and Darling Harbour in Sydney, Australia. His architectural firm was The Collaborative.

== Early career ==
Hoppenfeld graduated MIT as a planner in 1952, served in the military, and obtained a Master's degree in planning from Berkeley. He worked under Edmond Bacon on Philadelphia's urban renewal planning committees. In 1959 he was hired by Bill Finley at the National Capital Planning Commission. Both Finley and Hoppenfeld joined the Rouse company together in 1963.

== James W. Rouse ==
Hoppenfeld worked as a planner for the Rouse Company on the Columbia, Maryland development in Howard County, Maryland starting with the development of the Village of Cross Keys. Hoppenfeld traveled on a six-week tour with Rouse in Europe to survey post-war planned communities. Hoppenfeld left the Rouse company in 1975 during company cutbacks to become the dean of the University of New Mexico school of architecture and planning. Hoppenfeld returned to Columbia to form a private consulting company and teach at Catholic University.

In 1982, he joined Enterprise Foundation with James Rouse, who later founded the for-profit Enterprise Development Company (EDC) to develop festival marketplaces in smaller cities. Hoppenfeld's architectural firm, The Collaborative, designed the EDC's Portside Festival Marketplace in Toledo, Ohio, which opened in May 1984, alongside Water Street Pavilion in Flint, Michigan, which opened in June 1985, three months after his death.

In 1984, Hoppenfeld was sent by Rouse to Australia to develop the Harbourside Festival Marketplace, a festival marketplace design modeled after the Inner Harbor's Harborplace. Hoppenfeld died of a heart attack while jogging in Columbia in March 1985, before the project was completed. A statue located on the edge of Lake Kittamaqundi named "The Hug" by Jimilu Mason was commissioned to honor Hoppenfeld.
