= Mathias J. DeVito =

American lawyer and businessman (1930–2019)

- Born: August 23, 1930; Trenton, New Jersey, U.S.
- Died: July 24, 2019 (aged 88); Ruxton, Maryland, U.S.
- Education: University of Maryland, College Park (B.A.); University of Maryland School of Law (J.D.)
- Occupations: Businessperson, lawyer
- Employer(s): Piper and Marbury; The Rouse Company
- Children: 2

Mathias J. DeVito (August 23, 1930 – July 24, 2019) was an American businessperson and lawyer. He served as the president and chief executive officer of The Rouse Company. DeVito was previously a Maryland assistant attorney general and partner at Piper and Marbury law firm.

== Early life and education ==
DeVito was born on August 23, 1930, in Trenton, New Jersey, to Margaret and Charles DeVito. His father was a paperhanger. DeVito graduated from Trenton Central High School in 1948. He attended Rider College and completed a B.A. in English at University of Maryland, College Park in 1954. He earned a Juris Doctor degree with honors from University of Maryland School of Law in 1956. DeVito was an editor of the Maryland Law Review and a member of the Order of the Coif. He became a member of the Maryland bar in 1956.

== Career ==
After law school, DeVito was a clerk for Judge Morris Ames Soper. In 1957, he was joined the Piper and Marbury law firm where he became partner. On June 26, 1963, the attorney general Thomas B. Finan appointed DeVito as an assistant attorney general, stating that DeVito would serve as counsel for the Maryland Insurance Administration and the Maryland State Department of Education.

=== The Rouse Company ===
DeVito was part of the Piper legal team assisting The Rouse Company to purchase farmland that would later become Columbia, Maryland. In 1968, DeVito joined The Rouse Company as general counsel. He became executive vice president and chief operating officer in January 1970. As the executive vice president, DeVito oversaw the operations of the Rouse Company. He became president of Rouse Company in 1973. From 1972 to 1975, DeVito decreased the Rouse Company’s number of employees from 1,700 to 500. From 1975 to 1976, DeVito assisted with restructuring the Company. In 1979, he succeeded the founder, James Rouse as chief executive officer. During his time as the CEO, DeVito changed the Rouse Company from being an "entrepreneurial developer" to one of the largest U.S. commercial property owners. DeVito worked behind the scenes while James Rouse was the face of projects including the Harborplace and Faneuil Hall Marketplace. In 1984, DeVito became chairman of the Rouse Company. His calming style of management was noted by others in the Company. In 1987, DeVito halted the development of new projects. In December 1994, DeVito announced he would step down as CEO in February 1995. The Rouse Company's earnings increased under his leadership from $10.6 million in 1978 to $82.5 million in 1994. The company developed 77 shopping centers over the course of 20 years including Quincy Market, The Gallery at Market East, New Orleans Riverwalk, The Shops at National Place, South Street Seaport Festival Marketplace, and Union Station Mall in St. Louis. After DeVito retired from the Rouse Company in 1995, Baltimore Mayor, Kurt Schmoke, requested his assistance with an urban revitalization project spurred by a $100 million federal empowerment zone grant from the Clinton Administration.

=== Community involvement ===
From 1970 to 1972, DeVito was the chairman of the board of Trustees of the Maryland State College Board of Trustees. In late 1972, Governor Marvin Mandel announced that DeVito would lead a commission to study the structure of education in Maryland from kindergarten to college. In 1973, he was a member of the board of directors of Howard Research and Development, Development Corp., and Rouse-Wates, Inc. He was a trustee of Johns Hopkins University, Allied Irish Banks, and US Airways. At Maryland Institute College of Art, DeVito endowed a scholarship. He was a member of the Greater Baltimore Committee (board chair from 1990 to 1992) where he co-chaired the initiative to bring a National Football League franchise to Baltimore. He was a board chairman of Empower Baltimore Management Corporation, and served on the boards of the Business Committee for the Arts, The Enterprise Foundation, Baltimore Symphony Orchestra, and Walters Art Museum. He was on the board of Roanoke College.

== Personal life ==
DeVito was a resident of Ruxton, Maryland. He spent summers hiking at the Adirondack Mountains. He was a reader. DeVito was married to Rosetta Kormuth, a former legal assistant. They had a son and daughter. He died on July 24, 2019, of kidney failure at the Greater Baltimore Medical Center. He was survived by his wife, children, and four grandchildren.

== Honors ==
In April 1987, the Small Business Administration recognized DeVito as Maryland's Minority Advocate of the Year. In 1989, DeVito was named "CEO of the Decade" in the real estate industry by Financial World. In March 1995, Financial World selected him as CEO of the year. The Wall Street Transcript named DeVito the top CEO in the real estate industry in 1982, 1983, 1984, 1985 and 1988. On April 17, 1996, DeVito received a distinguished graduate award from University of Maryland School of Law.
