= Willard Rouse II =

American real estate developer

- Born: Willard Goldsmith Rouse II; 1910; Easton, Maryland, US
- Died: October 20, 1971 (aged 60–61); Franklin Park Mall, Toledo, Ohio, US
- Other name: Bill Rouse
- Known for: Land development, shopping malls
- Spouse: Katherine Parker
- Children: 2, including Willard Rouse III
- Parents: Willard Goldsmith Rouse; Lydia Agnes Robinson
- Relatives: James Wilson Rouse (brother); Edward Norton (great-nephew)

Willard Goldsmith Rouse II (1910 – October 20, 1971) was an American real estate developer who supported and partnered with his brother Jim Rouse to develop malls, and planned communities.

Bill Rouse took on the role of supporter for his brother after the death of their parents in 1930. He funded his education, and secured Navy transport for him from Ernest L. Jahncke to return home from the University of Hawaii. He founded the Rouse Company with his brother.

== Personal life and family ==
Rouse was found dead in the restroom of a Rouse Mall project in Toledo, Ohio on 20 October 1971.

Rouse was the son of Lydia Agnes (née Robinson) and attorney Willard Goldsmith Rouse. His son is developer Willard Rouse. He was the brother of developer James Rouse and a great-uncle of actor Edward Norton.
