= Melvin Berman =

Melvin Berman may refer to:

- Melvin Berman (musician) (1927–2008), American oboist of the Montreal Symphony Orchestra
- Melvin J. Berman (1915–1996), American land developer
