= Bright field =

Bright field may refer to:

- MV Bright Field, a bulk cargo ship
- Bright-field microscopy
