= Melvin J. Berman =

Maryland land developer (1915-1996)

Melvin James Berman
- Born: January 14, 1915; Alabama
- Died: February 20, 1996 (aged 81)
- Resting place: California
- Employer(s): Howard Research and Development, Citizens Bank, Berman Enterprises
- Known for: Land development, co-founding Columbia, Maryland.
- Spouse: Helene
- Children: Stephen Lazur Berman, Dennis Lee Berman, Laurie Berman
- Relatives: Wolford Berman

Melvin James Berman (14 January 1915 – 20 February 1996), was a prominent land developer and real estate owner in the Washington DC area. He was instrumental in the creation of Columbia, Maryland along with his development partner James Rouse.

In 1932, Melvin J. Berman moved from DeFuniak Springs, Florida near the Alabama border to Howard County. While he came from wealth, the Depression convinced him to seek his own fortune up north and he hitchhiked to Baltimore, working in the dairy business for his uncle. He met his first business partner, a dairy distributor, Arthur V. Robinson soon after. Berman also partnered with his younger brother Wolford. In 1952 the assets of Highland Farm #2 "Olney Acres" became available at auction. In November 1955, Robinson became a member of the Maryland and Virginia Milk Producers Association Inc. Robinson used the association money to purchase Olney Acres dairy farm in Howard County, Maryland from his partner Berman for $1,000,000. Berman became his partner and they used company funds to buy additional property surrounding the farm while earning a salary from the cooperative. Robinson then resold the properties to his family, and resold them again to Aladdin Construction Corporation developer Joseph Martelleni, subsequently forming Hammond Village in the process. Additionally, Berman and Robinson partnered on a second milk plant in New York. Robinson did not have to appear in trial for fraud, because he died in an airplane crash in Baltimore.

In 1954, Berman built the Ingleside Shopping center, from onsite offices. The Investment Corporation of Maryland purchased and developed the J Frank Gwynn farm in what would eventually become Columbia.

In 1950, Berman started in land development, building the Laurel Shopping Center.

== Early life ==
The Berman family has Southern Jewish roots. His family had a presence in Opp, Alabama where Benjamin Buford Blue Berman, Melvin's grandfather, was born. When Melvin was 18 months old, his family moved to DeFuniak Springs, a small town on the Florida Panhandle near the Alabama border. In the 1930s, amidst the hardships of the Great Depression, Melvin Berman left Florida at the age of 17, hitchhiking to Baltimore.

== Columbia ==
In 1958 Berman became a founding member of the shopping center development company, Community Research and Development along with James Rouse, later becoming director of The Rouse Company. In 1961, Berman pursued his own Howard County for the company's next development. In 1962, Berman took interest in a 1,032 acre parcel of land assembled by land developer Robert Moxley comprising four farm properties from the Carroll, Kahler, Wix, and his uncle James R. Moxley Sr's families. He desired roughly 15,000 acres to create a parcel large enough for an envisioned 100,000 person development. Rouse's attorney Jack Jones set up a grid system to secretly buy land through dummy corporations and keep costs low. Moxley's firm Security Realty Company (now Security Development Group Inc), negotiated most of the land deals for Jones, becoming his best client. CRD accumulated 14,178 acres (57.38 km^{2}), 10 percent of Howard County (located between Baltimore and Washington), from 140 separate owners. The $19,122,622 acquisition was funded by Rouse's former employer Connecticut General Life Insurance, at an average price of $1,500 per acre ($0.37/m^{2}). When purchasing started, approval would have fallen on another family member, County Commissioner and land developer Norman E. Moxley.

By late 1962, citizens elected an all-Republican three member council. J. Hubert Black, Charles E. Miller, and David W. Force campaigned on a slow-growth ballot, but later approved the Columbia project. In October 1963, the acquisition was revealed to the residents of Howard County, putting to rest rumors about the mysterious purchases. These had included theories that the site was to become a medical research laboratory or a giant compost heap. Ten years later, Councilman Charles E. Miller said if he could do it over again, he wouldn't have approved Columbia. He stated that he felt exploited, and that the subsidized housing would become a problem for the rest of the county.

== Berman Enterprises ==
Berman Enterprises is a multi-generational real estate and investment holding company. Melvin J. Berman and I. Wolford Berman founded the company in 1952.

Today, the company and its affiliates own and manage more than 9 million square feet of commercial office, retail, industrial/flex and residential properties. These are located in Maryland, Virginia, Illinois, North Carolina and Pennsylvania. Berman Enterprises also owns several hundred acres of developable land representing hundreds of thousands of square feet of development potential. Berman Enterprises maintains a balance sheet with conservative debt ratios, with a focus on controlled growth. With significant cash on hand for investments, real estate acquisitions during depressed market periods and value add repositioning of these assets has become a key strategy of Berman Enterprises.

In addition to its real estate activities, the company has interests in private equity, ownership and management in commercial mortgages, retail businesses, venture capital and international business consulting.[26]

== Academy ==
In 1999 Hebrew Academy of Greater Washington, founded in 1944, moved to its current location in Rockville, Maryland. It was renamed the Melvin J. Berman Hebrew Academy, in honor of Berman. The academy started operations at the former Montgomery County Peary High School, abandoned since 1988. In 1996, the school signed a lease for the 20 acres of land, obligating itself to a nine million dollar cleanup, and giving Berman's company the right to re-purchase the land for future development.
