= Willard Goldsmith Rouse =

American lawyer and businessman

- Born: April 14, 1867; Creswell, Maryland, U.S.
- Died: July 31, 1930 (aged 63); Union Memorial Hospital, Baltimore, Maryland, U.S.
- Education: Johns Hopkins University
- Spouse: Lydia Agnes Robinson
- Children: 7, including Willard and James
- Relatives: Willard Rouse (grandson); Edward Norton (great-grandson)

Willard Goldsmith Rouse (April 14, 1867 – July 31, 1930) was an American attorney, businessman, and father of land developer James Rouse.

== Youth, education, early career ==
Rouse was born in Creswell, Maryland, the son of Harriet Bayliss (née Hanway) and John Goldsmith Rouse. He was a lawyer trained at Johns Hopkins University who once ran as the state's attorney for Harford County, Maryland. When he lost, the Rouse family moved from Bel Air, Maryland to Easton, Maryland. Rouse died due to cancer of the bladder in Maryland and his wife to heart failure, and lost his home on Brooklett's Avenue to bank foreclosure.

== Personal life ==
Rouse was the great-grandfather of actor Edward Norton.

Rouse's other son, Willard Rouse II, and grandson, Willard Rouse III, were also notable real estate developers.
