= The Rouse Company =

Defunct American real estate developer

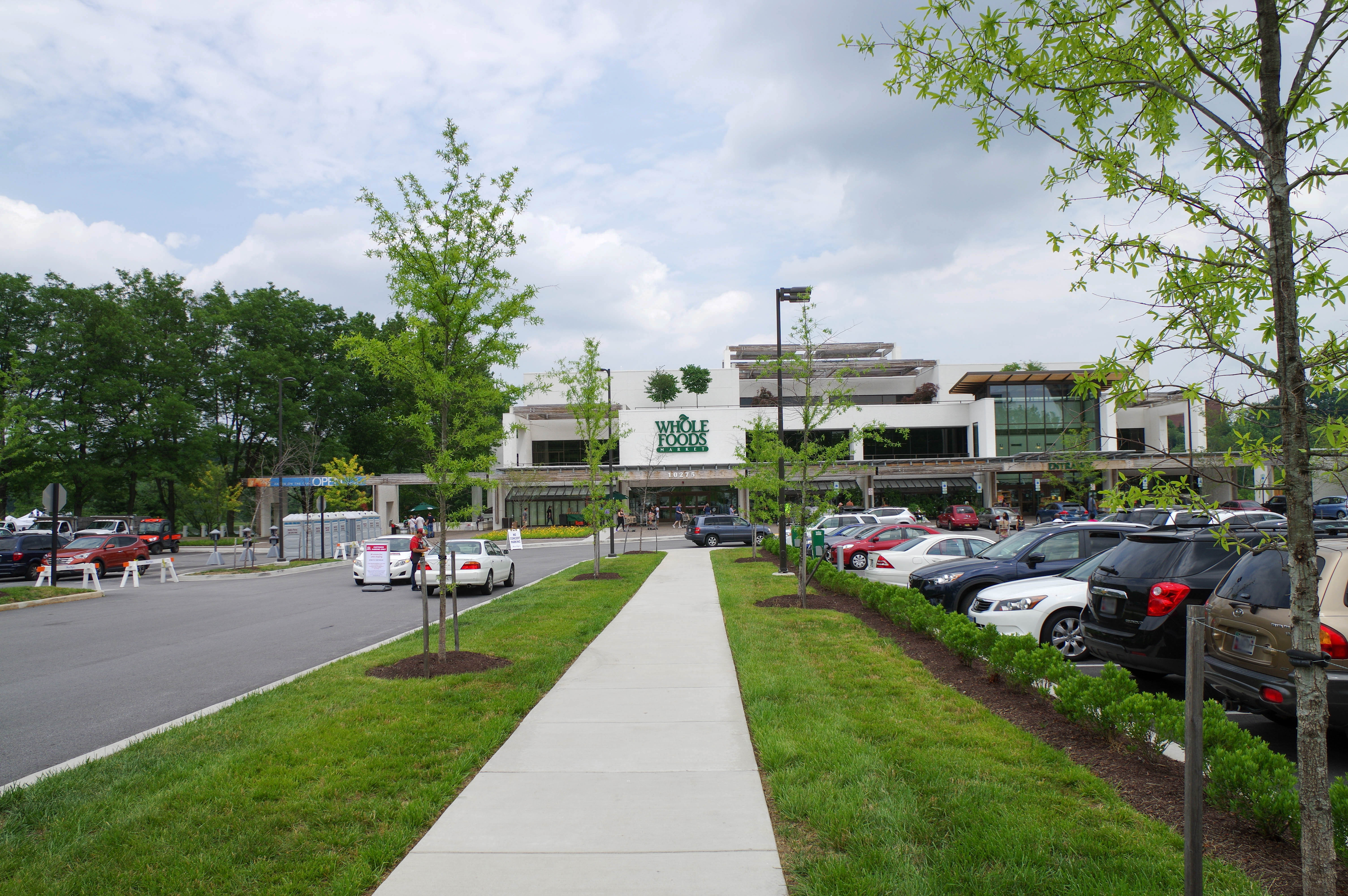
- Former Rouse headquarters, later a Whole Foods Market store
- Formerly: The Moss-Rouse Company (1939–1954); The James W. Rouse Company (1954–1966)
- Type: Public (REIT)
- Traded as: NYSE: RSE
- Industry: Real estate investment trust (1999–2004)
- Predecessor: The Moss-Rouse Company; Community Research & Development, Inc. (for mall development, c. 1956–1966)
- Founded: 1939; 87 years ago (The Moss-Rouse Company); 1954; 72 years ago (The Rouse Company)
- Founder: James Rouse
- Defunct: 1954 (The Moss-Rouse Company); 2004 (The Rouse Company)
- Fate: Acquired by General Growth Properties
- Successors: General Growth Properties; Howard Hughes Corporation
- Headquarters: Columbia, Maryland, United States
- Key people: James W. Rouse, Melvin J. Berman, Mathias J. DeVito, Hunter Moss, Churchill Gibson Carey, Charles "Chili" Jenkins.
- Products: Shopping malls; Mixed-use development; Festival marketplaces; Master Planned Communities ("New Towns")
- Subsidiaries: The American City Corporation; Howard Research & Development, Inc. Community Research & Development, Inc. Summa Corporation; Rouse Property Management
- Website: therousecompany.com at the Wayback Machine (archived January 2004)

The Rouse Company was a publicly traded shopping mall and community developer from 1954 until 2004, when General Growth Properties (GGP) purchased the company. It was founded by Hunter Moss and James Rouse in 1939.

== Beginnings: Moss-Rouse Company ==
The Moss-Rouse Company was founded as a FHA mortgage company with a loan from Hunter Moss's sister. Rouse leveraged his knowledge as loan guarantee specialist at the Federal Housing Administration to establish a Baltimore-based mortgage company specializing in FHA backed loans. Moss-Rouse hired a World War Two Navy friend, Churchill G. Carey from Connecticut General, who in turn provided capital for future projects. Carey would hold positions ranging from president to CEO of the mortgage company subsidiary. In 1952-1953 the company built one of the first modern architecture office buildings on Saratoga Street in Baltimore, while also dropping its commercial lending business line. Jim Rouse hired his brother, Willard Rouse II, in 1952, and partner, Hunter Moss, phased out of operations, selling his shares of the company, while remaining temporarily on the board of directors. The firm was renamed the James W. Rouse & Company, Inc., with Rouse owning 50% equity, his brother, Willard, 10%, and 40%, to company officers.

== The James W. Rouse Company ==
The James W. Rouse Company built some of the first enclosed shopping malls, and it pioneered the development of festival marketplaces, such as Jacksonville Landing in Jacksonville, Faneuil Hall Marketplace in Boston, South Street Seaport's Pier 17 Pavilion and Fulton Market Building in New York City, Harborplace in Baltimore, and Bayside Marketplace in Miami. It also developed The Shops at National Place in downtown Washington, D.C., which opened in 1984–85.

On June 20, 1966, The James W. Rouse Company was renamed to The Rouse Company. The company has been credited with opening the first successful food court in an enclosed shopping mall: the Gourmet Fair food court at Sherway Gardens in Toronto in 1971, which was the Rouse Company's first mall built in Canada. It followed an unsuccessful attempt at the Plymouth Meeting Mall in 1968, which reportedly failed because it was "deemed too small and insufficiently varied."

The company moved its headquarters to the Cross Keys development, then to its project in Columbia, Maryland, in December 1969.

Its community projects include the Village of Cross Keys in Baltimore and the planned communities of Columbia, Bridgeland Community, Texas, and Summerlin, Nevada. To develop these projects, in 1962 Rouse brought on Bill Finley, who built a planned "company town", Ravenswood, West Virginia, was a former planner with the National Capital Planning Commission proposing planned cities, and was a proponent of public-private partnerships.

In 1956, the company founded Columbia Development Corporation, a public company; Community Research & Development (CRD) and Howard Research & Development (HRD), both Rouse subsidiaries, to raise capital for four mall projects and later to facilitate the Columbia Project with Connecticut General and Chase Manhattan as stakeholders with interest-deferred loans. In 1966, the company was restructured as the Rouse Company; adding HRD as a separate entity shielded The Rouse Company from the debt liability of the Columbia development. HRD lost money, with new rules affecting the parent company as well. In 1974, HRD was refinanced. Columbia Development Corporation was formed a subsidiary of HRD using subcontracted Rouse Company employees. In 1985, Cigna (Connecticut General) divested its interest in HRD and the project back to Rouse for $120 million at a net loss. The Rouse Co. also created the subsidiary Rouse Property Management, Inc. for mall management.

Rouse created the subsidiary company The American City Corporation to take advantage of the National Urban Policy and New Community Development Act of 1970, A HUD program which granted developers incentives and loans to build Title VII "New Towns" with mandatory percentages of low income housing projects. Rouse's former ACTION member, Leo Molinaro was selected to run the subdivision. The symposiums held by the company gathered together investors like George Mitchell, who would go on to develop Woodlands, Texas using the Columbia model. The subsidiary was based at "Two Wincopin" in the second office building in built in Columbia in 1968. It was renamed the American City Building, using the subsidiary to lease the empty space and develop the system of Public-Private partnerships that Rouse would use worldwide to minimize risk in developments using public debt. The business was given its own postal office, the American Cities Station in 1977.

The Columbia development was marketed as a progressive community for all races. In 1971, the company responded to pressure from the NAACP that the company was absent of African Americans at all management levels and its businesses in Columbia were predominantly white owned. The company responded with an affirmative action program in November 1971.

In 1973, the former assistant attorney general of Maryland, Mathias J. DeVito, left the Rouse-owned legal firm of DLA Piper to replace James W. Rouse as president of the Rouse Company, and Rouse became chairman. DeVito cut staff from 1,700 to 500 to keep the company afloat in 1975. In 1974, the Columbia development got a political boost when the population of Columbia supported a slate of at-large council candidates with Columbia interests, including Ruth U. Keeton, Lloyd Knowles, and Columbia's city manager, Richard L. Anderson.

In 1979, Simon H. Schuer acquired a 7.5% interest in the Rouse Company. He was the creator of "The Shrink", a method where an investor buys an interest in a company, then has the company buy more of its own stock to make the interest more valuable. Schuer died the day after the purchase, and Trizec Properties then acquired the shares and bought a 25% stake. In 1986, the company attempted to purchase a majority share.

James Rouse retired as chairman on May 24, 1984.

In 1985, The Rouse Company absorbed all of Connecticut General's interests in the Howard Research and Development subsidiary. In 1986, former general manager of Columbia and executive vice president of development Micheal Spear became president as a successor to Rouse. In 1990, Spear died in a crash with his wife and one daughter in his Piper PA-31T Cheyenne attempting a single engine missed approach near Logan International Airport.

In 1987, The Rouse Company announced that it wouldn't build any more festival marketplaces following the failures of its festival marketplaces developed under a separate subsidiary founded by James Rouse being the Enterprise Development Company (EDC); Water Street Pavilion in Flint, Michigan, 6th Street Marketplace in Richmond, Virginia and Portside Festival Marketplace in Toledo, Ohio. The last festival marketplace the company developed was Jacksonville Landing in Jacksonville, Florida. Additionally, James Rouse learned from this that the "festival marketplace" concept, albeit successful for Faneuil Hall and Harborplace, is not a universal solution for urban decline, and he admitted that he was unaware that some of the cities like Flint and Toledo needed specific demographics, as Flint had severe problems by the time the Water Street Pavilion opened, and that the concept relied heavily on tourism, not general shoppers. He also learned that inefficiently designed malls, such as The Shops at National Place and 6th Street Marketplace, can cause accessibility problems and maintenance issues (the failed HVAC system at 6th Street Marketplace).

In September 1988, The Rouse Company acquired McCormick Properties.

Mathias DeVito retired as CEO in February 1995. In 1997, Anthony Deering took over as CEO of the company.

On November 12, 2004, The Rouse Company was sold to General Growth Properties.

In 2012, General Growth Properties spun off 30 "Class-B" malls into Rouse Properties, a new real estate investment trust named after (but otherwise unrelated to) The Rouse Company.

== Projects ==
- Freedom Shopping Center (1953) - A 308 unit combination apartment complex and shopping center funded by Moss-Rouse.
- Mondawmin Center (October 1956) - Baltimore, Maryland Opened in October 1956 as an outdoor mall with partner Harry Bart. Enclosed and renamed to Mondawmin Mall in 1963.
- Talbottown Shopping Center (1957) - An Easton shopping center adjacent to the Spring Hill Cemetery where citizens rejected early Alexander Smith Cochran modernist architecture.
- Harundale Mall (1958–1997) - Glen Burnie, Maryland Financed by Connecticut General. First enclosed mall east of the Mississippi River. Closed in 1997, demolished shortly thereafter, now Harundale Plaza, an outdoor shopping center.
- Charlottetown Mall (1959–Early 2000s) - Charlotte, North Carolina Then known as Midtown Square since 1989, it was closed and demolished in 2006.
- North Star Mall (1960) - San Antonio, Texas
- Cherry Hill Mall (1961) - Delaware Township, now Cherry Hill, New Jersey.
- The Mall (Louisville) (1962) - Louisville, Kentucky Now known as Mall St. Matthews.
- Pocantico Hills (1962) - A cancelled "Village" concept for John D. Rockefeller's grandchildren. David Rockefeller would later finance $10 Million of the Columbia Project.
- Northway Mall (August 1962) - Pittsburgh, Pennsylvania The Rouse Company enclosed this shopping mall and renamed it to Northway Mall. It was previously known as Northway Shopping Center and is now known as The Block Northway.
- The Village of Cross Keys (1963) - First "planned community" conversion of a golf course to high-rise residential and commercial. It includes The Shops at Cross Keys, a mini-mall also known as Village Shops, and The Quad, an office building.
- Greengate Mall (1965–2001) - Greensburg, Pennsylvania Closed in 2001, demolished in 2003. Redeveloped as Greengate Centre, a power center.
- Columbia, Maryland (1966) - Howard Research and Development formed to build planned community of Columbia, Maryland.
- Plymouth Meeting Mall (1966–2027) - Plymouth Meeting, Pennsylvania Failed food court completed in 1968. Currently being sold to a new owner, Lubert Adler Partners, who plans to begin demolition and redevelopment of the mall in 2027.
- Salem Mall (1966-2005) - Trotwood, Ohio Closed in 2005, demolished shortly thereafter. Sears remained as a standalone building until 2014.
- Eastfield Mall (1967–2023) - Springfield, Massachusetts Closed and demolished in 2023.
- Almeda Mall (1968) - Houston, Texas
- Northwest Mall (1968–2017) - Houston, Texas Severely damaged by Hurricane Ike in 2008 and exacerbated by Hurricane Harvey in 2017. Closed permanently at the end of March 2017, with only Carolyn Thompson's Antique Center remaining open until the end of 2021.
- Willowbrook (1969) - Wayne, New Jersey Expanded in 1970
- Planned community (1969) - Greater Hartford Corporation formed to redevelop Hartford, Connecticut suburbs with Connecticut General funding.
- Echelon Mall (1970–2024) - Voorhees, New Jersey. Groundbreaking began in 1969 to build the Echelon Mall (Now the Voorhees Town Center). The mall opened in 1970. Closed April 19, 2024 due to two-alarm fire
- Military Circle Mall (1970–January 31, 2023) – Norfolk, Virginia Closed at the end of January 2023
- Planned community (1970) - Failed project to develop 10,600 acres of Staten Island as "New Richmond".
- Sherway Gardens (February 24, 1971) - Toronto, Ontario, Canada • Construction began in 1969. This was The Rouse Company's first mall built outside of the United States. It was built through subsidiary Sherway Centre Limited, and was credited as the company's first successful food court that it opened. While the original food court (known as Gourmet Fair) was demolished in 2017 to make way for Nordstrom and other tenants, it remains as a successful project for the company. Now known as CF Sherway Gardens after Cadillac Fairview Corporation purchased the mall in 2000.
- The Mall in Columbia (August 2, 1971) - Columbia, Maryland Construction began in June 1970. It remains as a successful mall for the company.
- Perimeter Mall (1971) - Atlanta, Georgia
- Highland Mall (August 4, 1971–April 30, 2015) - Austin, Texas Developed under The Rouse Company's subsidiary, Austin Malls, Inc. Formerly owned by General Growth Properties and Simon Property Group, it closed on April 30, 2015, and is now a college.
- Franklin Park Mall (1971) - Toledo, Ohio
- Woodbridge Center (1971) - Woodbridge Township, New Jersey
- Planned community (1972) - Failed project to develop Wye Island with 706 homes.
- Planned community (1973) - Failed project to develop 5,000 acres in Memphis, Tennessee at Shelby Farms with First Horizon National Corporation.
- Exton Square (March 15, 1973–June 30, 2026) - Square-shaped enclosed mall in Exton, Pennsylvania. It was planned for permanent closure and demolition at the end of 2025, but that was delayed because the redevelopment plans were rejected by the township.
- Paramus Park (March 14, 1974) - Paramus, New Jersey Jointly developed with Federated Stores Realty and the Connecticut General Life Insurance Company (now The Cigna Group) through subsidiaries Paramus Park, Inc. and Congen Properties, Inc. While Sherway Gardens was the company's first successful food court overall, this was their first successful food court in the United States.
- Granite Run Mall (August 1974–July 1, 2015) - Media, Pennsylvania Redeveloped into Promenade at Granite Run in 2015.
- Faneuil Hall Marketplace (1976) - Boston, Massachusetts The first festival marketplace developed by the company; it revitalized the marketplace and the Quincy Market into this concept. Its success is what led to subsequent, similar developments, including Harborplace, Pier 17 Pavilion, Tin Building and Fulton Market, Waterside, Portside, Water Street Pavilion, Bayside Marketplace, Sixth Street Marketplace, McCamly Place, and Jacksonville Landing.
- Tampa Bay Center (1976–2002) - Tampa, Florida Closed permanently in 2002, demolished in 2005. A facility for the Tampa Bay Buccaneers was built on the former site.
- Southlake Mall (1976) - Morrow, Georgia
- Hulen Mall (1977) - Fort Worth, Texas
- The Gallery at Market East (August 11, 1977–August 2015) - Philadelphia, Pennsylvania Expanded with the construction of The Gallery II in the 1980s. The mall closed in August 2015, and was partially demolished and redeveloped from 2016-2019 with the new name Fashion District Philadelphia.
- Beachwood Place (1978) - Cleveland, Ohio
- Augusta Mall (1978) - Augusta, Georgia
- James Rouse retires from The Rouse Company as CEO in January 1979 and Mathias DeVito takes over.
- Governor's Square (August 16, 1979) - Tallahassee, Florida
- In the early 1980s, Rouse reacquires Mondawmin Mall and renovates it, adding a parking garage structure. The parking garage was razed in 2008 to make way for Target, which closed in 2018 and, beginning in 2022, was also demolished.
- Muscatine Mall (February 1980) – Muscatine, Iowa Acquisition
- Harborplace (July 2, 1980–present) - Construction began in January 1979. A downtown festival marketplace in Baltimore's Inner Harbor built on the former site of the Baltimore Steam Packet Company docks. After decades of decline, neglect, and crime, the pavilions are scheduled for redevelopment, but demolition was delayed as of September 2026.
- Inner Harbor Super Cube Lights for Harborplace (1980) - The Rouse Company installed these lights, designed by RTKL Associates, across the Harborplace promenade and adjacent areas.
- Santa Monica Place (1980) - Santa Monica, California Jointly developed with The Hahn Company. Now an outdoor mall.
- The Falls (1980) - Kendall, Florida Outdoor mall. Now owned and managed by Simon Property Group.
- Staten Island Mall (1980) - Staten Island, New York 1980 acquisition and 1993 renovation
- The Citadel (August 1980) – (Colorado Springs, Colorado) Acquisition and 1984 renovation/expansion
- White Marsh Mall (August 12, 1981) - White Marsh, Maryland Just a few walks away from The Avenue at White Marsh, it was the first part of the White Marsh Town Center project in collaboration with Nottingham Properties. Planning started in the 1970s, but it was largely stalled until it finally opened in 1981.
- The Grand Avenue (1982) - Milwaukee, Wisconsin Currently under redevelopment as The Avenue.
- Burlington Center (August 1982–January 2018) - Burlington Township, New Jersey Opened in August 1982. Closed permanently in January 2018 following a problem with its fire sprinkler system with only Sears remaining until September 2018. The mall was demolished in 2021.
- James Rouse forms the Enterprise Foundation, which in turn creates the for-profit subsidiary, Enterprise Development Company.
- Waterside Festival Marketplace (June 1, 1983–October 2014) - Construction began in August 1981. First festival marketplace developed by Rouse's Enterprise Development Company (EDC) for smaller cities, though the main Rouse Company was involved with planning and construction. Festival marketplace in Norfolk, Virginia. The Waterside Annex (added in the 1990s) was closed and demolished in May 2016, but the main portion of the Waterside is now an entertainment complex known as Waterside District.
- Seaport Marketplace (July 28, 1983) - A downtown festival marketplace at the South Street Seaport in Lower Manhattan, New York City. The fourth Fulton Market building was completed on July 28, 1983, while the Pier 17 Pavilion (September 11, 1985–September 9, 2013), which included a shopping mall and an office building, was completed on September 11, 1985. It also involved a major renovation on the Tin Building. The Pier 17 Pavilion was extensively damaged by Hurricane Sandy in late October 2012. The Pier 17 Pavilion closed permanently in September 2013 and was demolished in 2014 to make way for a mixed-use Pier 17 building which included a rooftop entertainment venue, while the Tin Building was relocated and rebuilt in late September 2022.
- The Gallery II (October 12, 1983–August 2015) Expansion of The Gallery at Market East
- Portside Festival Marketplace (May 1984–September 1990) - Construction began in 1982. Failed festival marketplace in Toledo, Ohio that closed permanently just six years after its grand opening. The former marketplace was repurposed into a science museum called COSI Toledo, which closed in 2007 due to funding problems. Today, it is now known as the Imagination Station science center.
- Chapel Square (1984–2002) – New Haven, Connecticut Acquired in 1984. 1986 renovation. Closed in 2002
- The Shops at National Place (May 14, 1984–2008)
  - Eat at National Place (June 2005–May 2020) Failed festival marketplace in Washington, D.C. adjacent to the National Press Building. Expanded in April 1985. Closed permanently in 2008, with only the Eat at National Place food court remaining open until May 2020. As of February 2026, The Shops has been repurposed for office space, street-level retail and dining.
- Water Street Pavilion (June 27, 1985–September 1990) - Similar to Portside, this was a failed festival marketplace in Flint, Michigan that closed in just five years in operation and was also famously featured in Roger & Me in 1989. The pavilion was converted into a multi-purpose building known as University Pavilion for University of Michigan-Flint.
- St. Louis Union Station Mall (August 29, 1985–2018) / St. Louis Union Station Hotel (August 29, 1985–present) – St. Louis, Missouri Failed festival marketplace in St. Louis Union Station, a former train station that was renovated and converted into a mixed-use development in the 1980s. It closed permanently in January 2016, and was repurposed for St. Louis Aquarium at Union Station. The hotel, however, remains operational as a Curio Collection by Hilton.
- 6th Street Marketplace (September 18, 1985–September 2003) - Failed festival marketplace in Richmond, Virginia adjacent to the now-defunct Blues Armory and Richmond Coliseum buildings. Closed and demolished in 2003, with only the food court remaining open until 2008.
- McCamly Place (1986–2019) - Failed festival marketplace in Battle Creek, Michigan adjacent to a hotel. Closed in 2019, demolished in 2022.
- Riverwalk Marketplace (August 29, 1986–June 2013) - Festival marketplace in New Orleans, Louisiana. Closed in the summer of 2013, now an outlet mall, known as The Outlet Collection at Riverwalk.
- Owings Mills Fashion Mall (July 30, 1986–September 23, 2015) - Owings Mills, Maryland Originally planned to be called "Owings Mills Town Center", it was renamed to Owings Mills Fashion Mall when it opened due to environmental concerns regarding Rouse's intention to construct a lake, mirroring their Columbia development. Following competition from newer malls, the name was shortened to Owings Mills Mall in 1998. Closed in September 2015, demolished in 2017. Now Mill Station, a lifestyle outdoor shopping center.
- Bayside Marketplace (April 8, 1987) - Open-air festival marketplace in Miami, Florida.
- Jacksonville Landing (June 25, 1987–July 5, 2019) - The last festival marketplace developed by Rouse. A downtown festival marketplace in Jacksonville, Florida. Closed in July 2019, demolished in October 2019. The site is currently in the process of becoming green space, known officially as Riverfront Plaza (informally The Lawnding).
- Baltimore Center - A mixed-use development designed by Eberhard H. Zeidler, consisting of:
  - The Gallery at Harborplace (September 3, 1987–January 21, 2022) - Baltimore, Maryland Construction began in 1985, along with the adjacent structures. The last project developed under James Rouse's supervision entirely. A five-story shopping mall and office complex adjacent to the Harborplace Pratt Street Pavilion, the Harborplace Office Tower which opened the same year, and the Renaissance Harborplace Hotel. The mall closed permanently in 2022, and as of February 2026, there have been no plans to redevelop, renovate, or repurpose the mall.
  - Harborplace Office Tower (February 1988) - 28-story office tower built adjacent to the Gallery at Harborplace which opened around the same time, and the Renaissance Hotel, which opened two months later.
  - Renaissance Baltimore Harborplace Hotel (April 1988) - 12-story hotel built adjacent to the Gallery and Harborplace office tower.
- Westlake Center (1988) - Seattle, Washington Four story shopping center and office complex.
- Darling Harbourside Festival Marketplace (May 4, 1988–December 9, 2022) Renamed to Harbourside Shopping Centre. A downtown festival marketplace in Darling Harbour, Sydney, Australia that was inspired by the success of Harborplace. The Enterprise Development Company helped with the development of this festival marketplace in collaboration with The Hayson Group. Closed in December 2022, demolished shortly thereafter. Similar to Harborplace, it is being redeveloped into a mixed-use complex.
- Underground Atlanta (1989–2017) - Acquisition and renovation. Closed in the 2016–2017 period, and is currently undergoing redevelopment.
- Canyon Springs Mall (August 11, 1989–March 2004) – Riverside, California Failed planned shopping mall. Being announced by Rouse in 1989 with the formation of subsidiaries Rouse-Canyon Springs, Inc. and Canyon Springs Mall General Partnership, it was never developed because of the dissolution of local dev Rouse partnered with (T&S Development), and anchor stores pulling out of the project. The 86-acre site was sold to Transcan-Riverside for $25.2 million in early 2004 and shifted the development from an enclosed mall to a power center named Canyon Springs Marketplace, part of the Canyon Crossing development.
- Pioneer Place (1990) - Portland, Oregon Mixed-use development consisting of two retail pavilions and an office building known as Pioneer Tower. First phase including Atrium Shops.
- Arizona Center (1990) - Phoenix, Arizona Shopping center and office complex.
- Owings Mills Corporate Center (1990) Office complex nearby Owings Mills Mall. Now BECO Towers Owings Mills.
- Tempozan Marketplace (July 20, 1990) - Festival marketplace in Osaka, Japan developed as a public-private partnership with the Osaka Waterfront Development Corporation.
- Aloha Tower Marketplace (1994) - The last festival marketplace with James Rouse involved before his death in April 1996. It is in Honolulu, Hawaii. EDC joint venture to form Aloha Tower Associates for development. Now a mixed-use complex.
- Collin Creek (June 1995–July 31, 2019) - Plano, Texas Built in 1981 by Federated Stores Realty, the real-estate arm of Federated Department Stores (now Macy's Inc.); Rouse acquired a 30% stake in the mall and took over management in 1995. The rest of the shares were handled by then-owner Urban Retail Properties, which acquired the mall from JMB Realty Corporation.
- In 1996, The Rouse Company acquires Summa Corporation, then known as the Howard Hughes Corporation.
  - The Shops at Summerlin Centre (1996) - Following acquisition, Rouse took over development of this mall initially planned by Summa. However, the mall didn't begin construction until after Rouse and HHC became part of GGP.
  - Summerlin, Nevada (1996) Planned community
- Moorestown Mall (December 1997) – Moorestown, New Jersey Acquisition
- Oviedo Marketplace (March 4, 1998) - Oviedo, Florida The last indoor mall developed by Rouse from scratch. Now called Oviedo Mall, and is in the process of becoming mixed-use.
- In 1998, The Rouse Company acquires a significant portion of malls previously owned by TrizecHahn (formerly The Hahn Company). The following malls acquired by them were:
  - Towson Town Center (1998) - Towson, Maryland The Hahn Company completed a massive renovation and expansion in 1991.
  - Bridgewater Commons (1998) - Bridgewater, New Jersey
  - Fashion Place Mall (1998) - Salt Lake City, Utah
  - Park Meadows (1998) - Denver, Colorado
  - Fashion Show (2000) - Paradise, Nevada Renovated from 2000-2003.
- Providence Place (1998) - Providence, Rhode Island Interest
- Pioneer Place II (2000) - Portland, Oregon Second phase of the development includes the Rotunda Shops. This was The Rouse Company's last enclosed retail pavilion.
- In 2002, The Rouse Company enters a joint venture with Simon Property Group and Westfield Group to acquire several of Rodamco North America/Urban Retail Properties' assets. The following malls acquired by Rouse were:
  - Water Tower Place (2002) - Chicago, Illinois
  - Oakbrook Center (2002) - Oak Brook, Illinois
  - Collin Creek (2002–July 2019) - Plano, Texas Rouse acquired the remaining shares of this mall it did not own from 1995.
  - The Streets at Southpoint (March 2002) - Durham, North Carolina Under construction by the time of the acquisition.
  - Lakeside Mall (2002–2024) - Sterling Heights, Michigan
  - Perimeter Mall (2002) Reacquired
  - North Star Mall (2002) - San Antonio, Texas Reacquired
  - Willowbrook (2002) - Wayne, New Jersey Reacquired
- The Village of Merrick Park (September 28, 2002) - Coral Gables, Florida Planned community consisting of an open-air mall of the same name until 2012, and The Office at Merrick Park. It was last project The Rouse Company completed entirely before being acquired by General Growth Properties. The retail component is now known as The Shops at Merrick Park.
- Christiana Mall (March 2003) - Christiana, Delaware 50% stake acquisition from PREIT.
- La Cantera Center (2005, phase I only) - San Antonio, Texas Also an open-air mall. Later renamed to The Shops at La Cantera. Jointly designed with the USAA Real Estate Company. Rouse developed Phase I of this mall. After General Growth Properties acquired Rouse in 2004, General Growth Properties finished the rest of the mall by completing Phase II in 2008.

=== Projects and investments with unknown (or multiple) opening/acquisition dates ===
- Columbia Corporate Center - Columbia, Maryland Numbered 10 through 80, The Rouse Company developed many of these, including 70 Columbia Center, 40 Columbia Center, and 80 Columbia Center, through individual subsidiaries, such as Fifty Columbia Corporate Center, Inc.
- The Shoppes at Harbour Island (Early 1990s–June 1995) Failed festival marketplace in Tampa, Florida. After the Enterprise Development Company failed to redevelop the facility, it was returned to Beneficial Corporation, the original developer of Harbour Island. The mall closed in the summer of 1995, and today, it is now a mixed-use facility known as The Pointe.

=== Related properties ===
- Washington Union Station Mall (September 29, 1988) Festival marketplace in Washington, D.C. This mall was developed by former Rouse Company executives.
- Liberty Place (1990) – Philadelphia, Pennsylvania This project includes a skyscraper, shopping mall and hotel, and was developed by Liberty Property Trust, then known as Rouse & Associates, by Willard G. Rouse III.
