= National Place Building =

Mixed-use in NW Washington, D.C.

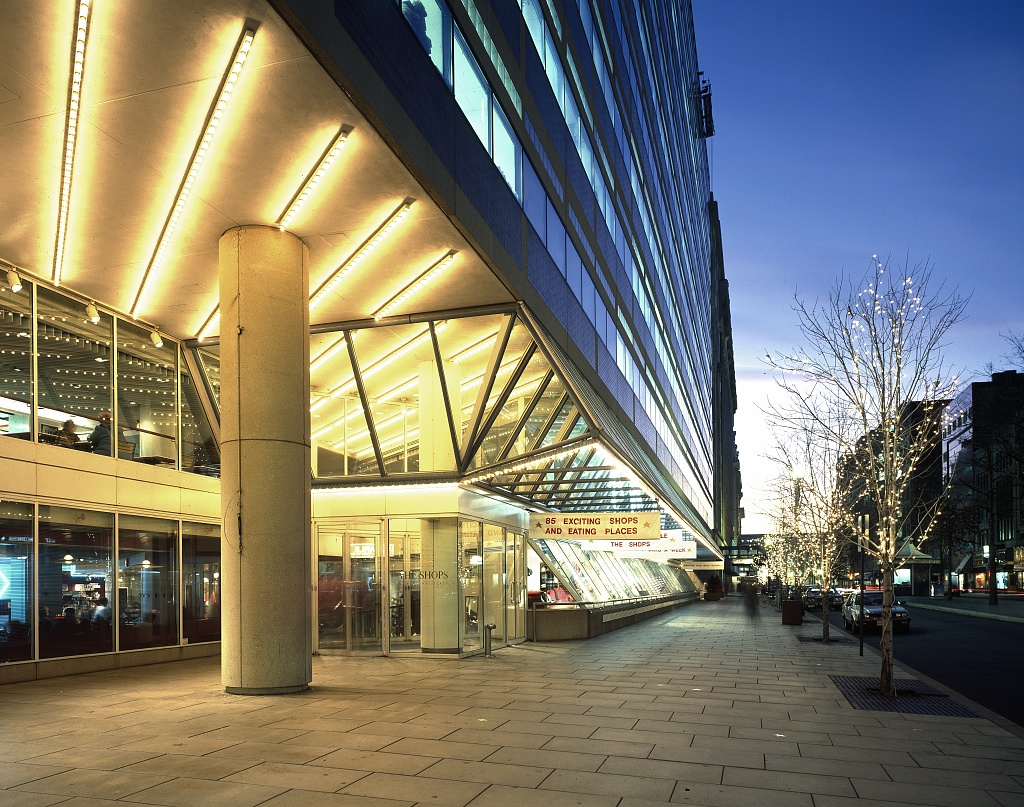
- Main entrance to The Shops, c. 1993
- Alternative names: 1331 Pennsylvania Avenue

General information
- Status: Completed
- Type: Mixed-use
- Location: Northwest Washington, D.C., United States, 1331 Pennsylvania Avenue NW, 20004; 13th and 14th F Streets
- Coordinates: 38.8968°N 77.03130°W
- Opened: May 14, 1984; 42 years ago (phase I); April 25, 1985; 41 years ago (phase II, The Shops); June 2005; 21 years ago (Eat at National Place)
- Closed: 2005–2008; 18 years ago (The Shops at National Place); May 2020; 6 years ago (Eat at National Place)
- Owner: Quadrangle Development Corp.
- Operator: CBRE Group and Dochter & Alexander (retail space only); JLL Properties and Cushman & Wakefield

Technical details
- Floor count: 16

Design and construction
- Architects: HTB, Inc., Frank Schlesinger and Geier Brown Renfrow
- Developer: The Rouse Company; Marriott Corporation; Quadrangle Development Corp.

Other information
- Number of stores: 93 (at peak)
- Parking: Parking garage with 454 spaces; Paid parking

Website
- nationalplacedemo.com; eatatnationalplace.com at the Wayback Machine (archived June 16, 2013)

National Place is a large, 16-story building consisting of street-level retail and dining, with office space on the upper levels. It is adjacent to the National Press Building, and originally housed The Shops at National Place and The Shops at the National Press Building (or simply The Shops), a three-level, enclosed shopping mall in downtown Washington, D.C., opening in 1984 and 1985 as a festival marketplace. It is located on the block bounded by Pennsylvania Avenue, F Street, between 13th and 14th Streets NW, the former site of the Munsey Trust Building. It was located near the Metro Center station of the Washington Metro system.

In April 2015, owner Quadrangle Development Corporation intended to demolish the mall and replace it with a 283,000 square feet (26,300 m^{2}), 13-story building. However, that plan was abandoned for unspecified reasons. Since June 2005, a small food hall with 10+ vendors, branded Eat at National Place, operated in a portion of the mall, but the food hall closed permanently in May 2020.

== History ==
=== 1978–1985: Development and opening ===
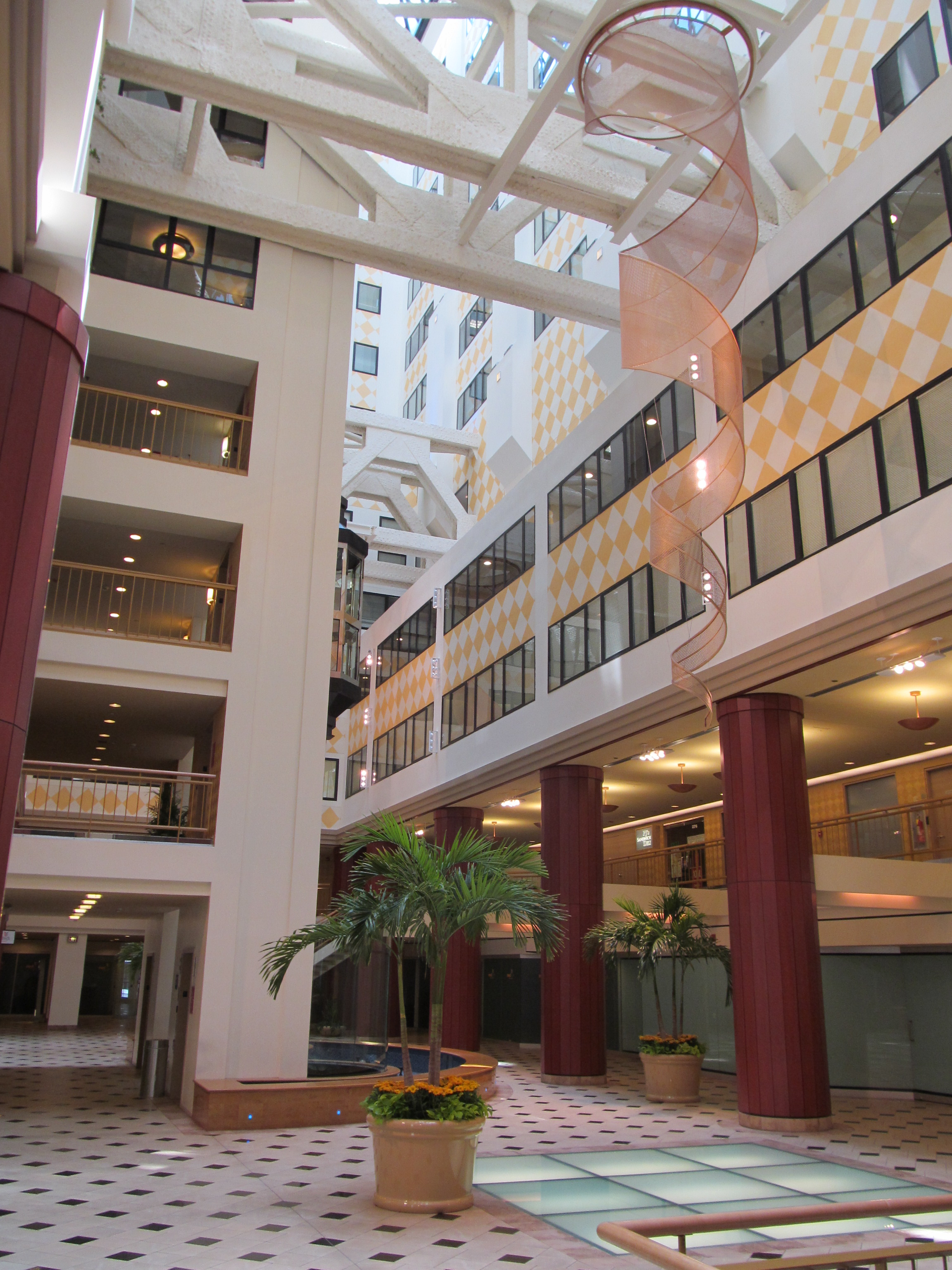
The Shops at National Place's 14-story atrium before renovations, interior view, ground level, c. June 2012

National Place's development dates back to December 1978, where Quadrangle Development Corporation, The Rouse Company, and Marriott Corporation entered a joint venture for the $110 million project. Over the years, Pennsylvania Avenue had become filled with abandoned houses, parking lots, and declining souvenir stores. The area had been neglected after racial riots occurred in the area.

Planning of the mall portion—The Shops at National Place and The Shops at the National Press Building—started in July 1980 as part of a major $28 million redevelopment project of the adjacent National Press Building by the National Press Building Corporation. The project would involve restoration of the 1927 structure, as well as adding 80,000 square feet (7,400 m^{2}) of retail and office space, including a 14-story atrium. The redevelopment project aimed to revitalize downtown Washington, D.C., with the Pennsylvania Avenue Development Corporation supporting private investment in the area through tax credits and other incentives for historic preservation. Architect HTB, Inc. of Oklahoma City was selected to design the work, ensuring to not disturb any existing amenities during construction.

Construction began in February 1982, and a ceremonial groundbreaking held on January 31 projected for an estimated completion in around 1983 or 1984. The project included connecting the National Press Building to nearby properties through an enclosed multistory atrium to form the concourse of stores and restaurants.

The National Press Building Corporation allowed the Rouse Company of Columbia, Maryland, to develop the retail portion of the project. Founder James W. Rouse and CEO Mathias J. DeVito cited that they were willing to help with development, following their successful festival marketplace model used previously on Harborplace in Baltimore and Faneuil Hall Marketplace in Boston. The Washington Post famously described Rouse's intention for the project as "gambling", as it attempted to squeeze in its Baltimore and Boston model in a building where doing such was risky. However, since the retail was going to be in the building, Rouse could not rely on its usual architectural firm for developing festival marketplaces, being Benjamin Thompson & Associates, Inc., making this the company's first festival marketplace in a large city without Thompson involved. Not only that, due to D.C. preservation rules, invasive structural reinforcements were prohibited, meaning the company could not build an open-air pavilion structure on the site. Additionally, Thompson was in the process of designing the competing Old Post Office Pavilion and the Washington Union Station Mall (which were also festival marketplaces), which further made choosing him and his firm unavailable.

As a result, after negotiations with D.C., Rouse decided to develop The Shops as an underground and atrium-linked shopping space beneath and attached to the National Press Club headquarters. The Rouse Company founded the legal affiliate TRC Holding Company of Washington, D.C., which in turn created the subsidiary Rouse–National Press Management, Inc. for development and day-to-day operations of the mall.

By late 1983, the project was almost complete, and The Shops opened its first phase on May 14, 1984. It was designed as a central piece in revitalizing downtown Washington, D.C.'s traditional downtown shopping core along F Street, NW, west of the Woodward & Lothrop flagship. The mall replaced the former flagship stores of Raleigh's and Joseph R. Harris Co.

Marion Barry at the grand opening of The Shops

The first phase included 53 stores. The 71,000-square-foot (6,600 m^{2}) retail complex was hailed as "part of a very important renaissance of downtown Washington." The Shops opened concurrently with a new 774-room JW Marriott Hotel (the first in that chain), and refurbished National Theater and National Press Building. Melart Jewelers and Sight and Sound Electronics were part of the first phase located in the JW Marriott lobby.

The 40-store phase two of The Shops opened April 25, 1985. It included August Max, Record Town, and Brooks Fashions among the original tenants. The complex featured a 14-story atrium for the refurbished National Press Building and 450 spaces of underground parking. At the opening ceremony, then-mayor Marion Barry proclaimed "Downtown is coming alive!"

=== Late 1980s – 2012: Decline and closure of The Shops at National Place ===
The Shops at National Place's struggles began in the late 1980s. It had a poor design that was isolated from the street, making it hard to access, with the majority of its tenants being "tucked in." It was seen as a miscalculation by the Rouse Company, as the company built the mall inside of a 15-story office building, even though the company was optimistic that it would be highly successful. During development, Rouse was unable to secure anchor retailers, leading to The Shops to resort to big-box tenants. Filene's Basement opened at The Shops in 1998 as an attempt to revitalize the facility. The Corner Bakery Cafe followed at the Shops at the National Press Building in November 1999. By late November 2002, The Colonnade concourse at the mall was fully vacant.

Following the mall's struggles, a food hall known as Eat at National Place (stylized as eat at National Place) was developed on the second floor of the mall, which had its grand opening in June 2005. The food court housed both local and national food vendors, including Five Guys and Moe's Southwest Grill. The food hall was part of a larger redevelopment that began in 2004, where a 10-year, $15 million second renovation occurred for the National Press Building. Despite the attempts of revitalization by adding a food hall, in 2008, due to many vacancies in the mall, competition from Union Station Mall, Fashion Centre at Pentagon City, and struggles from the Great Recession, The Shops at National Place officially closed its doors, except for the food court, and the passageway to the JW Marriott. The National Press building was sold to AEW Capital Management for $167.5 million in June 2011. On May 11, 2012, District Taco debuted across the food hall.

=== 2016–2020: Renovation and Eat at National Place closure ===
In April 2016, AEW sold the National Press building to Normandy Real Estate Partners for $155.5 million. The former 14-story lobby of The Shops at National Place was renovated in 2018 by Columbia Property Trust and designed by architectural firm SmithGroup, which included new LED lighting, updated stairs and upper-level railings, and the introduction of The Nexus, an office space. The facility also featured a new color scheme, being black and white, aiming to revitalize the space to make it more suitable for office workers and get it out of its abandoned status.

In the early 2020s, Normandy Real Estate Management was acquired by Columbia Property Trust, and the National Press building was sold to Cannon Hill Capital Partners, which later renovated the facility and the Eat at National Place food hall. This included refreshing the F Street lobby atrium, adding conference rooms, bike storage, a fitness center, and contemporary retail, including the SPiN Ping Pong Club venue.

The "Secret Starbucks" inside JW Marriott closed in April 2019 to relocate as a gift-shop counter. Eat at National Place permanently closed its doors in May 2020 following challenges from the COVID-19 pandemic. The food hall posted a notice on the entrance doors and its website thanking patrons, office workers, tour groups and visitors for "helping patronize our Food Hall for the past 15 years." Since Verizon Wireless was located inside of the food hall, it had to be relocated to 1318 F St NW after the food hall closed to remain accessible to customers. The new store was rebranded simply as Verizon.

=== Redevelopment ===
As of 2021, the former mall space has been repurposed for office and street-level retail and dining.

The retail portions of National Place are operated by CBRE. The office portions on the upper floors are managed by JLL. The majority of the abandoned spaces are labeled on CBRE's website as "Retail A–D" with an "Available" tag. The former Eat at National Place is marked on the site as "Second Level - Anchor Retail".

== See also ==
- Rainbow Centre Factory Outlet, which also sat abandoned due to a flawed architectural layout
- The Gallery at Harborplace, a similar project also developed by the Rouse Company
- Westlake Center, Arizona Center and Pioneer Place, all of which also developed by Rouse
