= Willard Rouse =

American real estate developer (1942–2003)

- Born: Willard Goldsmith Rouse III; June 19, 1942; Baltimore, Maryland, US
- Died: May 27, 2003 (aged 60); Phoenixville, Pennsylvania, US
- Education: University of Virginia
- Known for: Real estate development
- Spouse: Susannah Rouse
- Children: 8
- Parent(s): Willard Rouse II; Katherine Parker
- Relatives: Willard Goldsmith Rouse (grandfather); James Rouse (uncle); Edward Norton (first cousin once removed)

Willard Goldsmith Rouse III (June 19, 1942 – May 27, 2003) was an American real estate developer, best known for his role in the construction of Philadelphia's One Liberty Place.

== Early life and education ==
Willard Rouse, a native of Baltimore, Maryland, was the son of Willard Rouse II and the nephew of developer and urban planner James Rouse. Rouse spent two years stationed in West Germany while serving in the U.S. Army and graduated from the University of Virginia in 1966 with a degree in English.

== Career ==
After graduation, Rouse worked for several development firms (including The Rouse Company) before founding Rouse and Associates, a real estate development company primarily focused on office and industrial development, in 1972. Rouse and Associates went public in 1994 and is now known as Liberty Property Trust, headquartered in Wayne, Pennsylvania.

Rouse was the developer of One Liberty Place, designed by Helmut Jahn, the first structure in Philadelphia to exceed the traditional height limitation established by the top of the statue of William Penn atop Philadelphia City Hall. Rouse famously clashed with city planner Edmund Bacon over the 945-foot tower, which was controversial when initially proposed but, after its completion in 1987, was ultimately acclaimed as "the finest skyscraper Philadelphia had seen" in decades and a catalyst for the modernization of the Philadelphia skyline. One Liberty Place remained the tallest building in Philadelphia until the completion of the Comcast Center in 2007.

Rouse was also involved in the construction of the Kimmel Center for the Performing Arts and the Pennsylvania Convention Center. During plans to develop Penn's Landing, Rouse was the target of an extortion attempt by Philadelphia city councilman Leland Beloff and organized crime boss Nicodemo Scarfo. Rouse assisted the FBI in an undercover operation that led to the conviction of both Beloff and Scarfo.

Rouse was an active civic leader in Philadelphia, serving as chairman of the Pennsylvania Convention Center Authority and We the People 200, Inc., a celebration of the U.S. Constitution's 200th anniversary.

== Personal life and death ==
Rouse had eight children, six of them with his second wife, Susannah Rouse. In 2003, he died from lung cancer in his home in Phoenixville, Pennsylvania.
