= MV Bright Field =

Bulk cargo ship; collided with a building

History
- Name: MV Bright Field
- Operator: Cosco, Hong Kong
- Port of registry: Liberia
- Builder: Sasebo Heavy Industries; Sasebo, Japan
- Launched: September 1988
- Home port: Monrovia

General characteristics
- Tonnage: 36,120 GT; 23,035 NT; 68,676 DWT
- Length: 734.9 ft (224.0 m)
- Beam: 105.6 ft (32.2 m)
- Depth: 59.7 ft (18.2 m)
- Installed power: Diesel engine, 9,800 hp (7,300 kW)
- Propulsion: Single shaft

MV Bright Field was a bulk cargo ship that collided with the Riverwalk Marketplace shopping complex in New Orleans, Louisiana, on the afternoon of Saturday, December 14, 1996, after losing engine power. The vessel was fully loaded with grain at the time of the incident. The United States Coast Guard investigated the incident and published its findings on December 8, 1997, citing the cause of the engine failure as a poorly maintained oil filter. A secondary, but contributory, cause was determined to be a main-engine automation system that produced warnings and alarms that were not consistently relayed to the ship's master. The National Transportation Safety Board published its final report on January 13, 1998, which concurred with the Coast Guard's determinations and appeared to charge the ship's operating company with the responsibility for the casualty.

The incident resulted in no deaths, but 66 people were injured. Physical damage to Bright Field was calculated at $1,857,952. Damage to the Riverwalk, including the pier, condominium properties, shops and hotel, totaled an estimated $15 million. The spot where the Bright Field ran into the Riverwalk is marked on site with a plaque.

Bright Field was repaired immediately following the incident, and in 2000 was reportedly seen again in the New Orleans harbor bearing the name Bright Star. In 2007, the vessel was renamed Bright City, operating under the Liberian flag, and carrying a Chinese crew and, by May 2010, had been renamed Yong Xu Hai, under the Chinese flag.

The ship was decommissioned and scrapped in 2015.
