= Franklin Park Mall =

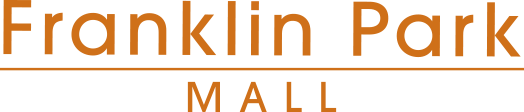

- JCPenney court (April 2026)
- Location: Toledo, Ohio, U.S.
- Coordinates: 41°41′42″N 83°38′27″W
- Address: 5001 Monroe Street
- Opened: July 22, 1971; 55 years ago
- Developer: The Rouse Company
- Manager: JLL Properties
- Owner: Pacific Retail Capital Partners
- Num. of stores: 150
- Num. of anchor tenants: 6 (4 open, 1 vacant)
- Floor area: 1,299,000 sq ft (120,700 m^{2})
- Floors: 1 with partial upper level (2 in anchors, 3 in parking garage)
- Parking: 6,100 spaces
- Public transit: TARTA
- Website: visitfranklinparkmall.com

Franklin Park Mall is a super-regional shopping mall in Toledo, Ohio. It is anchored by Dillard's, JCPenney, Dick's Sporting Goods, Urban Planet, and DSW. Currently, it is owned and managed by Pacific Retail Partners, and features over 130 retailers on its grounds, including Toledo, Ohio's only Apple Store.

== History ==
=== Development and early years: 1971-1974 ===
Developed by The Rouse Company, the mall opened on July 22, 1971, occupying the former site of the Franklin Airport. The mall was built using the Syncon modular building subsystems for an estimated savings of $500,000. When the mall opened, its original anchor stores were Hudson's, J. C. Penney, and local department store Lamson Brothers. The mall comprised about 75 stores in 940,000 square feet (87,000 m^{2}) of floor space, with the 294,000 square feet (27,300 m^{2}) J. C. Penney anchor being one of the largest in the chain at the time. Mall concourses featured sunken courts before the entrance to each department store, skylights, and a mobile constructed by Alexander Calder in front of the Hudson's entrance.

In 1974, Lamson Brothers went bankrupt and the store was replaced by Jacobson's of Jackson, Michigan. This store was the fourteenth in the Jacobson's chain.

=== Expansion and new anchors: 1992-1999 ===
In March of 1992, Franklin Park began a large expansion, and renovation project. This included cosmetic changes to the interior hallways, numerous new inline tenants, and a large 190,000 square foot Lion Store. The Lion Store officially opened for business on August 3, 1993. In 1998 the Lion Store was renamed Dillard's.

=== Westfield acquisition: 2000-2019 ===
In 2001, Hudson's was renamed Marshall Field's. The Westfield Group acquired the shopping center in early 2002, and renamed it "Westfield Shoppingtown Franklin Park." Jacobson's went bankrupt and closed its location in early 2002, days before Westfield announced the takeover.

The former Jacobson's was demolished in 2004 to make way for a new wing; the centerpiece of a massive $100 million renovation– opened in 2005. It was at this time that a new National Amusements multiplex theater and Dick's Sporting Goods were built, as well as a new Food Court and Borders books. Marshall Field's became Macy's in 2006. In 2008, Westfield Group held a press conference at Franklin Park to announce new stores DSW Shoes, Old Navy, and Ulta Beauty. The stores opened as part of the 49,000-square-foot (4,600 m^{2}) addition.

After Borders ceased operations in 2011, its space became Forever 21, which relocated from a smaller store within the mall. In fall 2013, the mall was sold to Starwood Capital Group with 6 other Westfield properties. As a result, it the mall's name reverted back to Franklin Park Mall.

=== Anchor closures: 2020-present ===
In December 2020, the mall was sold to Pacific Capital Retail Partners along with 6 other Starwood properties. In January 2025, Macy's announced that its store at Franklin Park Mall would close in the first quarter of 2025. It closed in March 2025. The location where the Macy's is has been listed on a real estate website, and it is unclear what will happen with the location going forward. In March 2025, Forever 21 announced it would file for bankruptcy protection and close all its U.S. locations, including its store at Franklin Park Mall, by May 1. The store at Franklin Park closed on March 30, 2025. Urban Planet opened in the former Forever 21 in June 2026.
