= The Village of Cross Keys =

Coordinates: 39.35527°N 76.64572°W

- Planned community
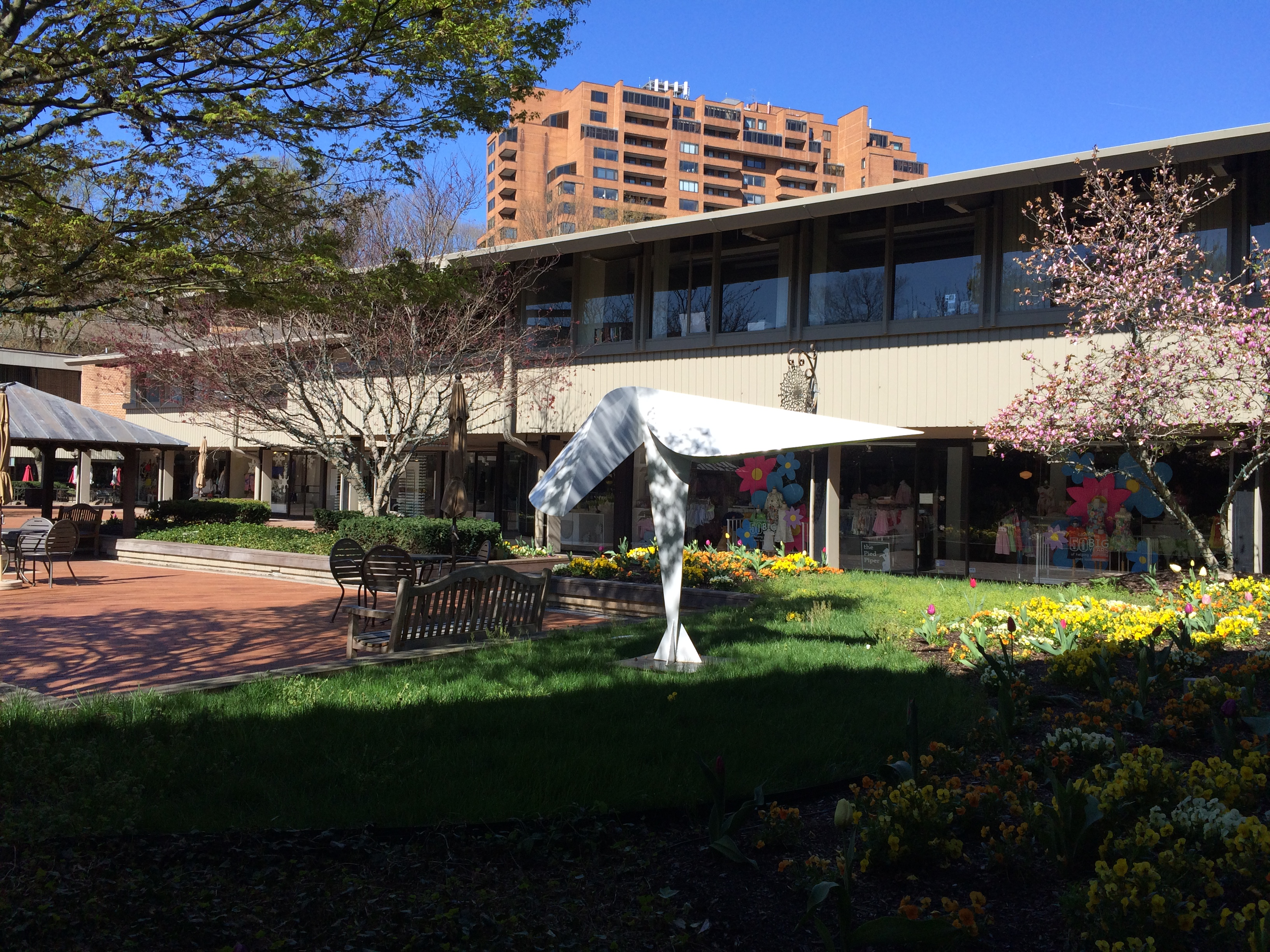
- The Village of Cross Keys

- Location within Baltimore
- Country: United States
- State: Maryland
- City: Baltimore
- Founded by: James W. Rouse
- Time zone: UTC-5 (Eastern)
  - Summer (DST): EDT
- ZIP code: 21210
- Area code: 410, 443, and 667

The Village of Cross Keys is a privately owned upscale area of Baltimore, Maryland. It is located off Maryland Route 25 (Falls Road) between Northern Parkway and Cold Spring Lane, and is home to luxury condos and upscale small shops.

Baltimore financier and mall developer James Rouse, founder of The Rouse Company, purchased the Frederick Law Olmsted Jr.-designed Baltimore Country Club Golf Course near his Roland Park home for $1,700,000 in 1963, site unseen. The 5,000-person village was built on the historic property in 1965. Michael D. Spear was the development director, later becoming CEO of the Rouse Company. It was the first in a series of planned communities developed by Rouse. Office space was occupied by Rouse until the company moved to its next development in Columbia, Maryland.

The retail component of the village declined with competition from Towson Town Center and The Shops at Kenilworth to the north and Harbor East to the South. The retail and office property was acquired by Ashkenazy Acquisition Corporation in 2012.

The office and retail components of the property were acquired from Ashkenazy by Caves Valley Partners in 2020 and are undergoing significant leasing activity and reinvestment.

== History ==
The original iteration of the community at Cross Keys was named after an 18th-century inn on Falls Road, then called Falls Turnpike Road, near Coldspring Lane. The inn initially provided overnight accommodations for travelers who transported goods to and from Baltimore; when freight and passenger traffic was diverted from the turnpike to the Baltimore & Susquehanna Railroad, the inn remained a social center for local residents. The community in the area originally was mostly African Americans—it was one of a series of free-born settlements along Falls Road, along with communities at Mount Washington, Bare Hills, and Shawan. The Cross Keys area was once known as West Roland Park, in reference to the adjacent neighborhorhood, however, it was listed as Cross Keys Village on early maps, and referred to simply as "The Road," or "The Falls Road," by its residents. The homes in the early settlement were clapboard bungalows which housed workers who likely worked in the nearby Jones Falls Valley mills. Only a few of the original 76 houses which made up the village before its redevelopment in the mid-20th century remain, with many having been demolished.

== Notable residents ==
- Oprah Winfrey Lived in Cross Keys from 1978 to 1983 while working for WJZ-TV.
- Former Maryland Governor Harry Hughes had lived in Cross Keys from 1971 until his death.

== See also ==
- Purnell, Baltimore, another neighborhood consisting of a large apartment complex; established and formerly owned by the Gorn family company tasked with Cross Keys' 2021 redevelopment
- List of Baltimore neighborhoods
