= The Outlet Collection at Riverwalk =

Shopping center in New Orleans, Louisiana, U.S.

Coordinates: 29°56′52″N 90°3′45″W

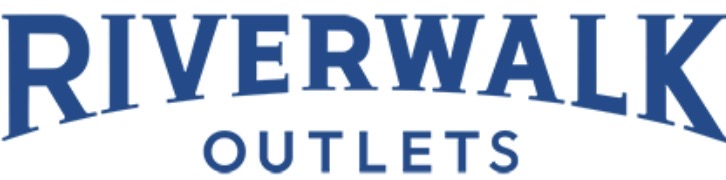

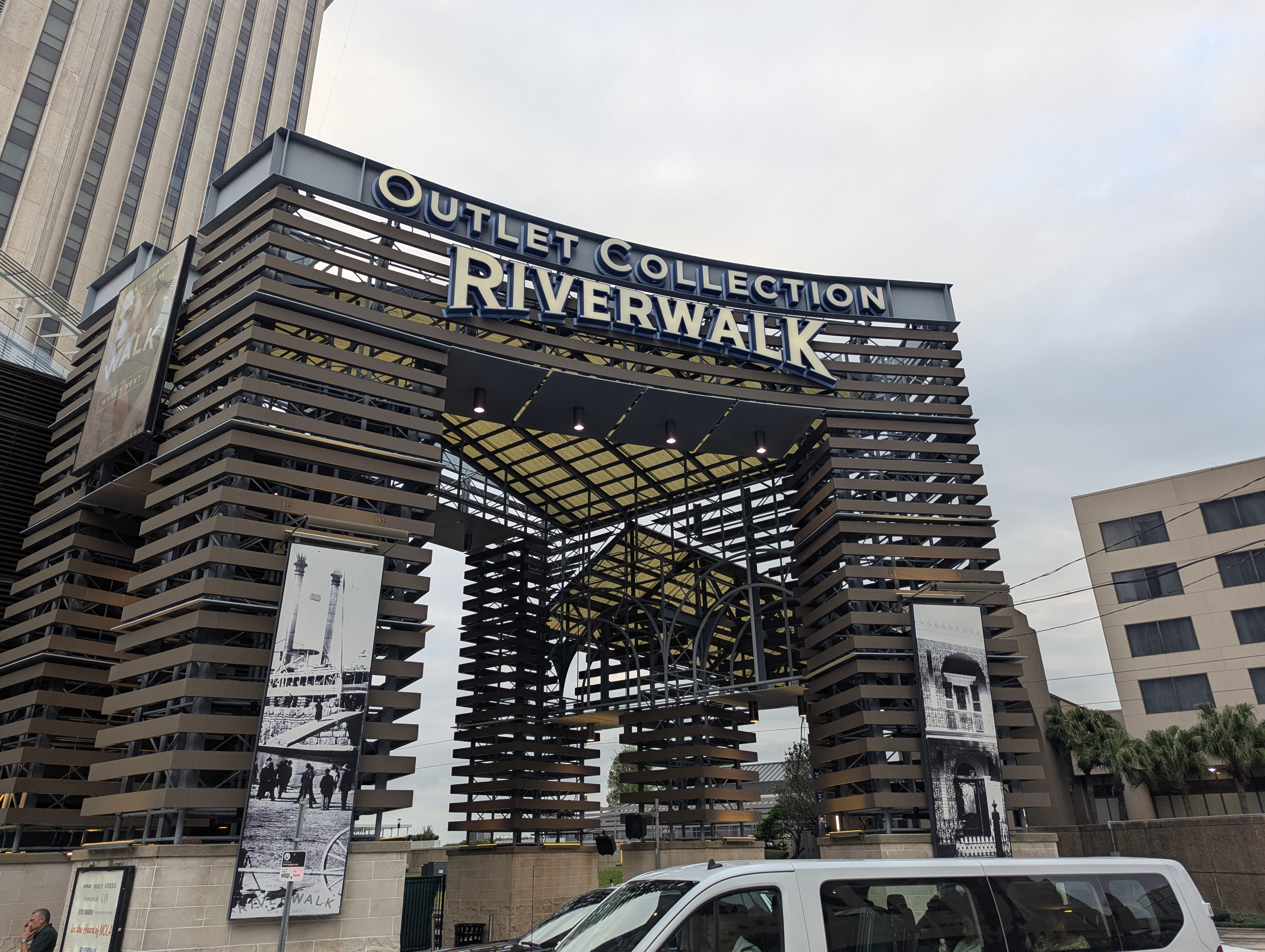
- Main entrance (November 2025)
- Location: New Orleans, Louisiana, U.S.
- Opened: August 29, 1986; 40 years ago (as Riverwalk Marketplace); May 22, 2014; 12 years ago (as The Outlet Collection at Riverwalk)
- Renovated: 1987; 2013–2014
- Closed: June 2013; 13 years ago (as Riverwalk Marketplace)
- Previous names: Riverwalk Marketplace (1986–2013)
- Developer: The Rouse Company
- Manager: RockStep Capital
- Owner: RockStep Capital (New Orleans Riverwalk); Port of New Orleans (land)
- Architect: Perez Associates
- Num. of stores: 120 at peak (as Riverwalk Marketplace); 75 at peak (as Riverwalk Outlets)
- Floor area: 250,000 square feet (23,000 m^{2})
- Floors: 3
- Website: riverwalkneworleans.com
- Building details
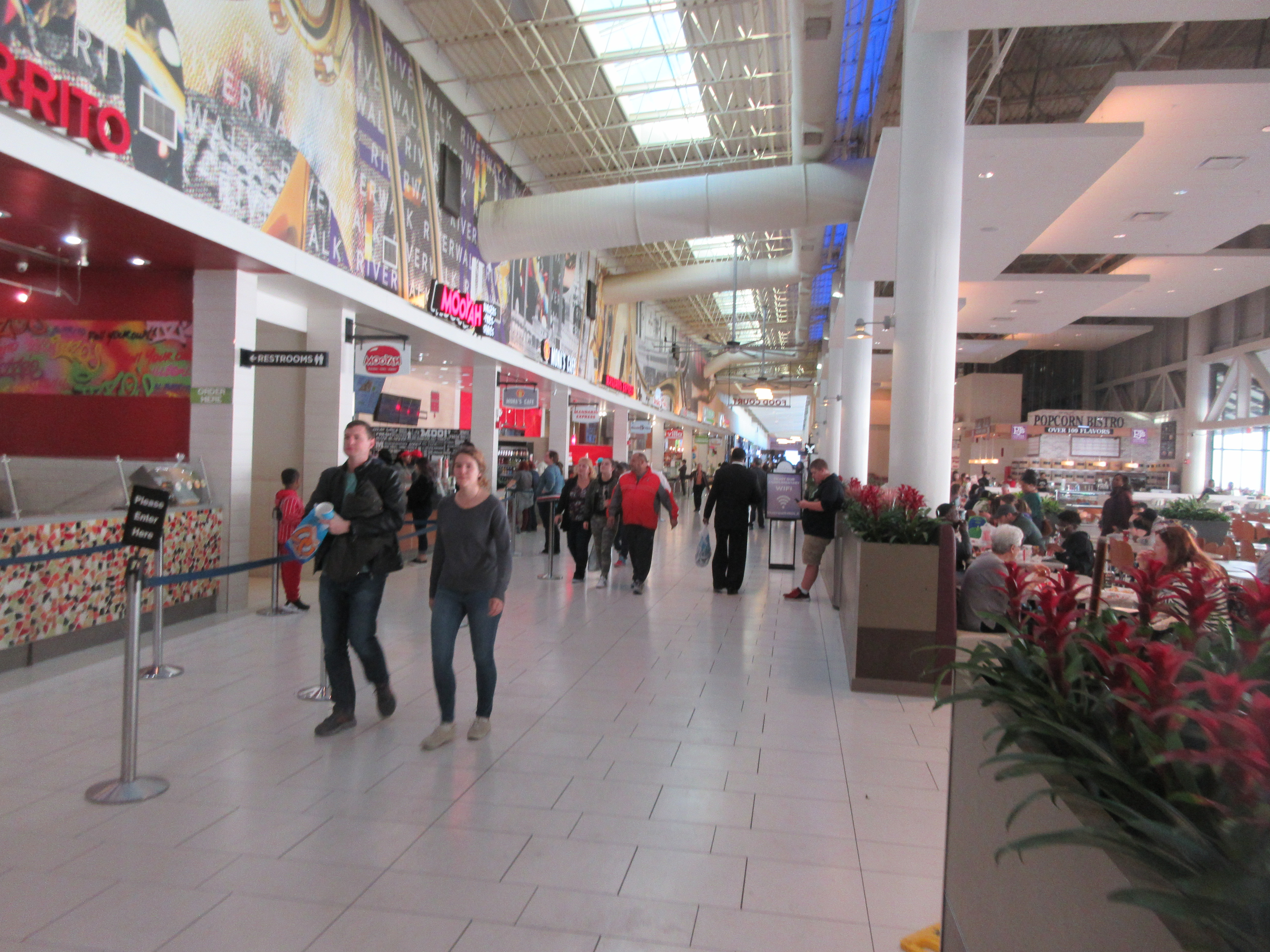
- A concourse of the food court in February 2019

General information
- Status: Operational (defunct as a festival marketplace)
- Type: Festival marketplace (1986–2013); Outlet mall (2014–present)

Design and construction
- Main contractor: HCB Contractors

Renovating team
- Architect: Omniplan Architects
- Renovating firm: Howard Hughes Corporation

The Outlet Collection at Riverwalk, or simply New Orleans Riverwalk, Riverwalk Outlets, or The Riverwalk, is an outlet center located in the Central Business District of New Orleans, Louisiana, United States, along the Mississippi River waterfront, stretching from the base of Canal Street, upriver to the New Orleans Morial Convention Center, and is connected to the Hilton New Orleans Riverside hotel.

The mall was originally known as Riverwalk Marketplace, a festival marketplace developed by the Rouse Company and opened to the public on August 29, 1986. However, the mall failed to make a profit, forcing Rouse to initiate a major remodel in 1987, which was not met with success either. The MV Bright Field crashed into the mall on December 14, 1996 after it lost electricity, and the mall also suffered critical damages from Hurricane Katrina in late August 2005, forcing General Growth Properties (GGP) to temporarily shut down the center.

The Howard Hughes Corporation (HHC) closed the marketplace in June 2013 to convert the building into an outlet mall, alongside rebranding it to The Outlet Collection at Riverwalk, which reopened to the public on May 22, 2014. As of 2022, the mall is owned by RockStep Capital, on land leased from the Port of New Orleans.

== History ==
=== 1982–1986: Development and opening ===
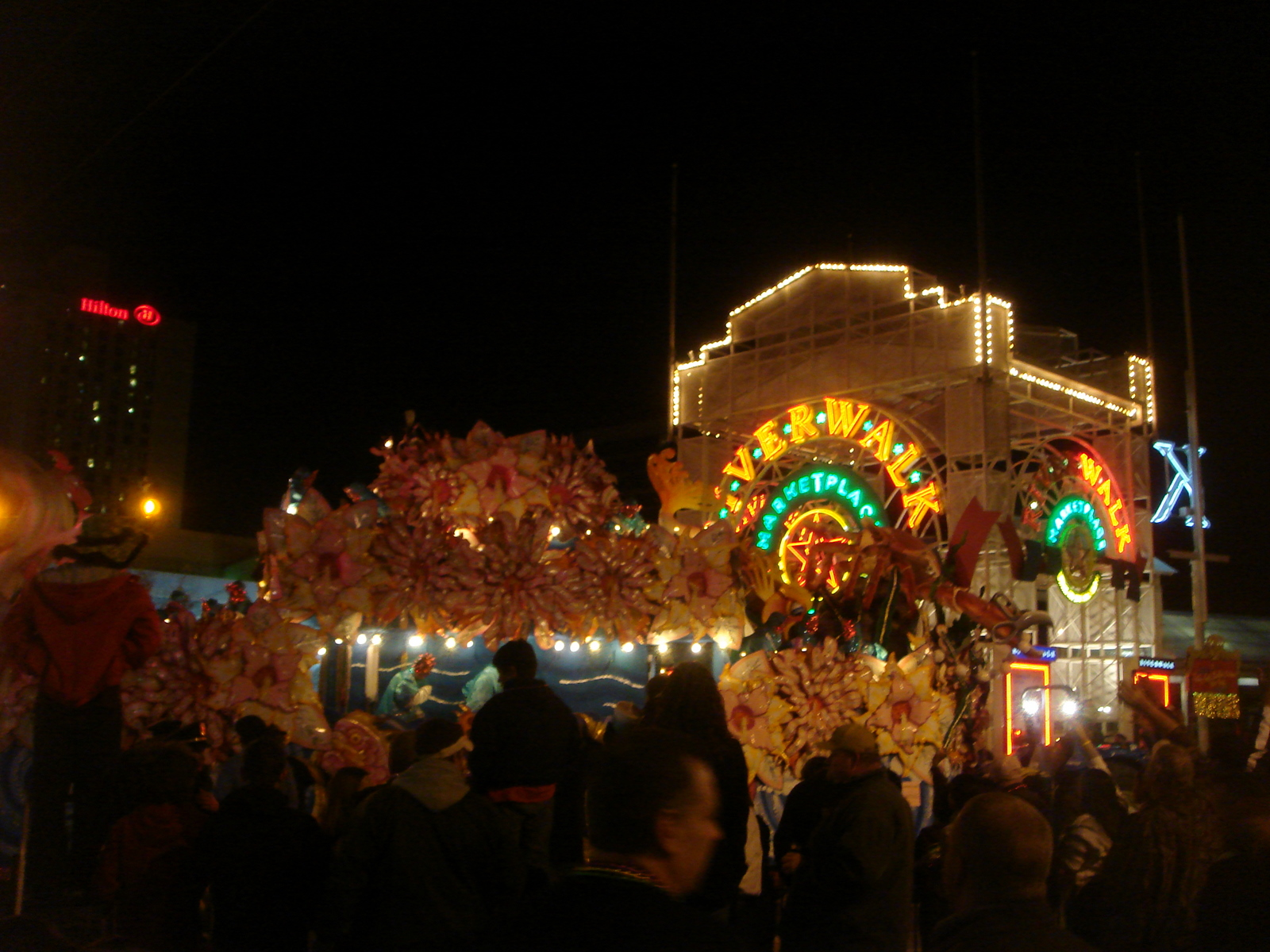
Riverwalk Marketplace in February 2009 at night

By the start of the 1980s, increased use of containers in shipping made some of the older riverfront wharves less useful, so the Poydras Street Wharf and the Julia Street Wharf were demolished, and the New Orleans Riverfront was used as part of the 1984 World's Fair, held from May 12 to November 11, 1984.

In 1982, The Rouse Company of Columbia, Maryland proposed a $55 million festival marketplace that would include retail pavilions, presenting detailed plans to the New Orleans City Council in June 1984. The project cost approximately $60 million in total, and would occupy portions of three former Dock Board wharves between Poydras and Julia Streets once the fair ended. The goal for the new development was to attract tourists and shoppers back to New Orleans following Rouse's previous success with Harborplace in Baltimore, and Faneuil Hall Marketplace in Boston, Massachusetts. This would be the last Rouse marketplace to have James W. Rouse involved with initial planning as Chairman of the Board before retiring in May 1984.

Original logo (1986–2013)

Riverwalk Marketplace had its grand opening celebration on August 29, 1986, with 5,000 attendees releasing balloons in the sky at New Orleans' Spanish Plaza. The mall drew an estimated 45,000 visitors on its first day of operation.

=== 1987–2013: Decline and closure ===
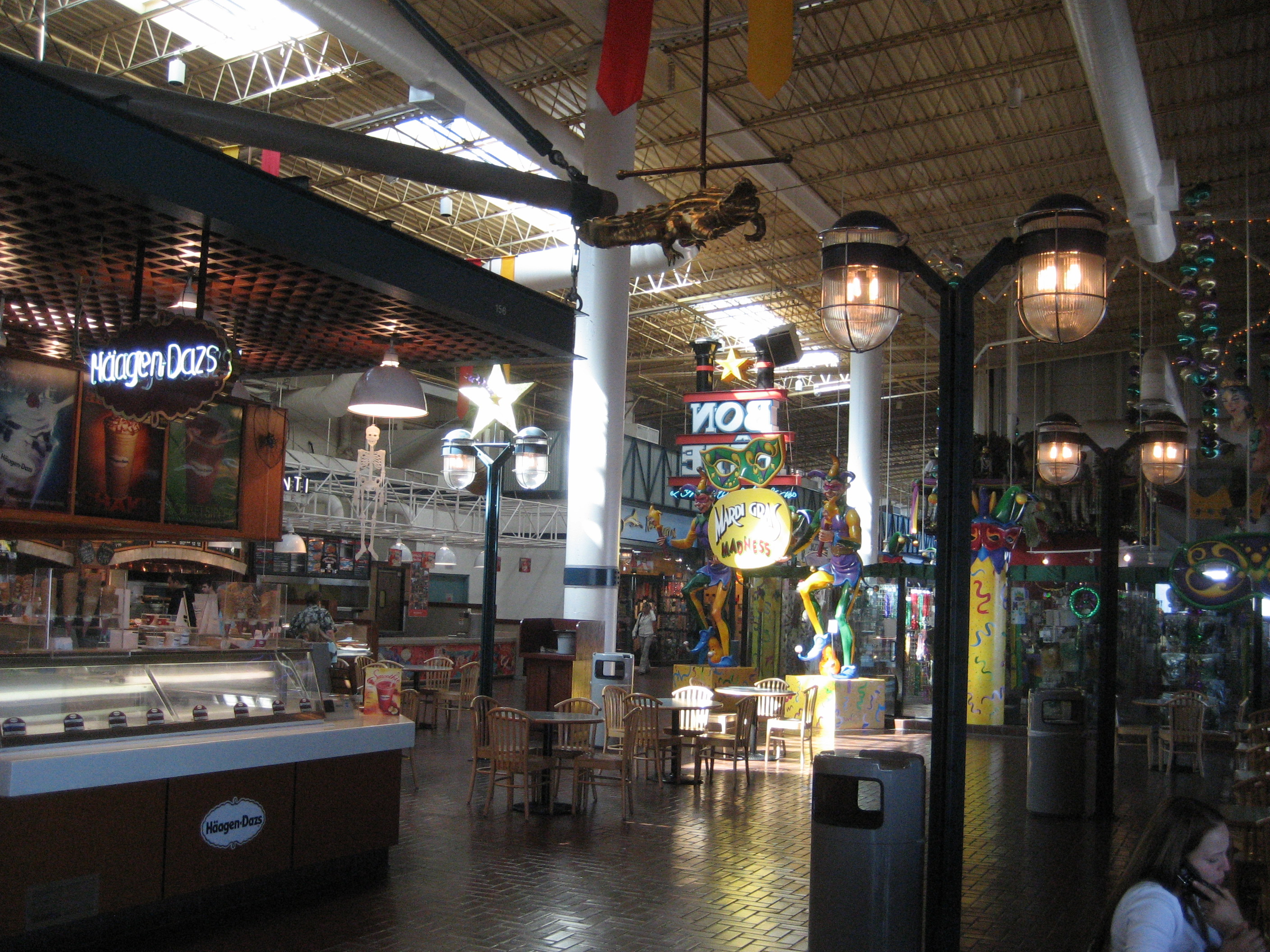
Häagen-Dazs wing (October 2007)

After the opening, Riverwalk immediately began to struggle, with 15% less visitors than expected. In 1987, The Rouse Co. spent $4.5 million in remodeling the mall just to rectify it. Original tenants included Banana Republic, Gap, The Sharper Image, the Warner Bros. Studio Store, and Eddie Bauer. Despite the 1987 remodel, Rouse reported in 1990 that the Riverwalk Marketplace was unprofitable.

==== MV Bright Field collision ====
On the afternoon of December 14, 1996, the MV Bright Field freightliner/bulk cargo vessel slammed into the mall. No one was killed in the accident, although approximately 66 were injured; fifteen shops were damaged. Damage to the mall, including the pier, condominium properties, shops, and hotel totaled an estimated $15 million. Physical damage to the Bright Field was calculated at $1,857,952. The spot where the Bright Field collided with the Riverwalk is marked on site with a plaque.

The mall was acquired by General Growth Properties (GGP) of Chicago, Illinois in November 2004 for $12.6 billion, alongside the Rouse Co. and the rest of its assets. Riverwalk Marketplace closed temporarily on August 29, 2005, after Hurricane Katrina, due to extensive wind and looting damage. Starting on November 21, 2005, the mall began a phased reopening, with only smaller tenants operating again first. By late December 2005, approximately 70% of the mall's stores would be open again, though decline continued throughout the area.

Occupancy increased from 30% to 40% in February 2006, eventually becoming 90% in 2011 following major repairs of Riverwalk Marketplace after Katrina, including new enhanced lighting, seating areas, cleaning, and general modernization. Despite this, tourism almost never recovered, and stores continued to close. After filing for Chapter 11 bankruptcy on April 16, 2009, GGP announced that "non-core" properties—including Riverwalk Marketplace—would undergo a corporate spin-off into a new firm, known as the Howard Hughes Corporation (HHC), which was completed in November 2010.

=== 2014 redevelopment as Riverwalk Outlets ===
In July 2012, the Howard Hughes Corp. announced that the struggling marketplace would be redeveloped into an upscale outlet mall, adding more space for tenants and general modernization of the 1980s interior, estimated to cost $70 million. Omniplan Architects worked closely with the HHC to help design the new facelift. Riverwalk Marketplace closed its doors in June 2013, and its remaining tenants were given 30-day notices to vacate to allow for construction.

The mall reopened on May 22, 2014, as The Outlet Collection at Riverwalk, featuring Coach Outlet, Loft, Nordstrom Rack, and Neiman Marcus Last Call Studio Outlet. It became the first upscale outlet center in a major U.S. downtown setting. The redevelopment added 50,000-square-foot (4,600 m^{2}) of retail space, expanding the mall's total size from 200,000 square feet (19,000 m^{2}) to 250,000 square feet (23,000 m^{2}).

=== After reopening ===
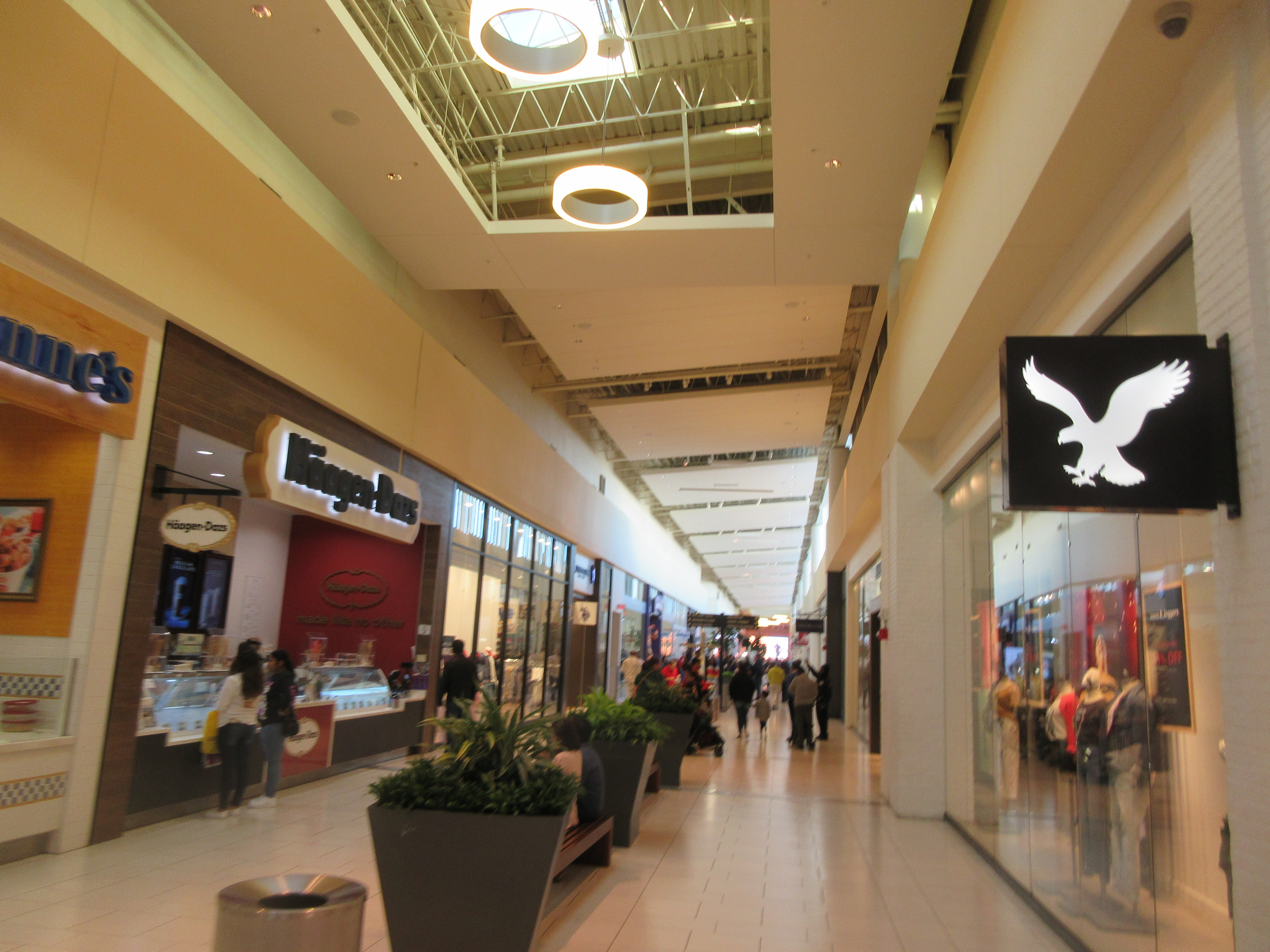
Hallway of the redeveloped Riverwalk Outlets in February 2019

Riverwalk Outlets closed temporarily in March 2020 due to the COVID-19 pandemic, leading to occupancy to fall below 50% as tourism decreased and social distancing restrictions arose. Starting in June of that year, the mall once again reopened in phases. Outdoor events were held to recover tourism by November 2021. Neiman Marcus Last Call closed permanently in mid-August 2020, after the parent company at the time, Neiman Marcus Group (NMG), filed for Chapter 11 bankruptcy in May of that year.

In July 2022, the Houston, Texas-based investment firm RockStep Capital acquired Riverwalk Outlets from the Howard Hughes Corporation for $34 million. Burlington had its grand opening at Riverwalk Outlets on October 24, 2025, and it was the company's first store in New Orleans. It replaced Forever 21, which closed its Riverwalk Outlets store in May due to Chapter 11 bankruptcy, which forced the store to cease all U.S. operations.

Francesca's, an American women's fashion brand, announced on January 15, 2026, that all of its stores, including Riverwalk Outlets, would be liquidated after going bankrupt. On September 21, 2026, the mall celebrated its 40th anniversary, introducing Pandora, Bath & Body Works, and the Cosmetics Company Store as its new retailers.

== Gallery ==
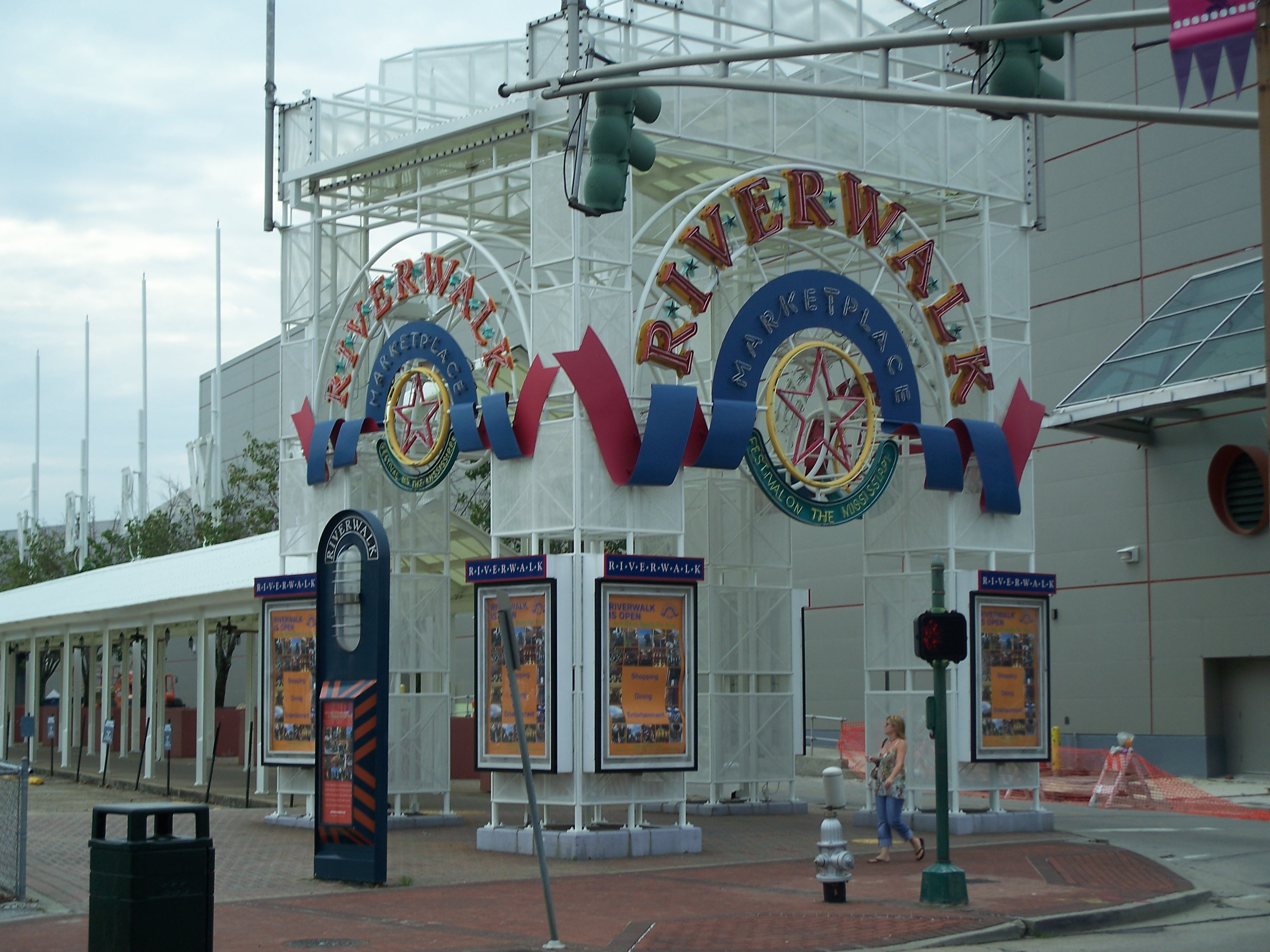
Julia Street entrance (June 2007)

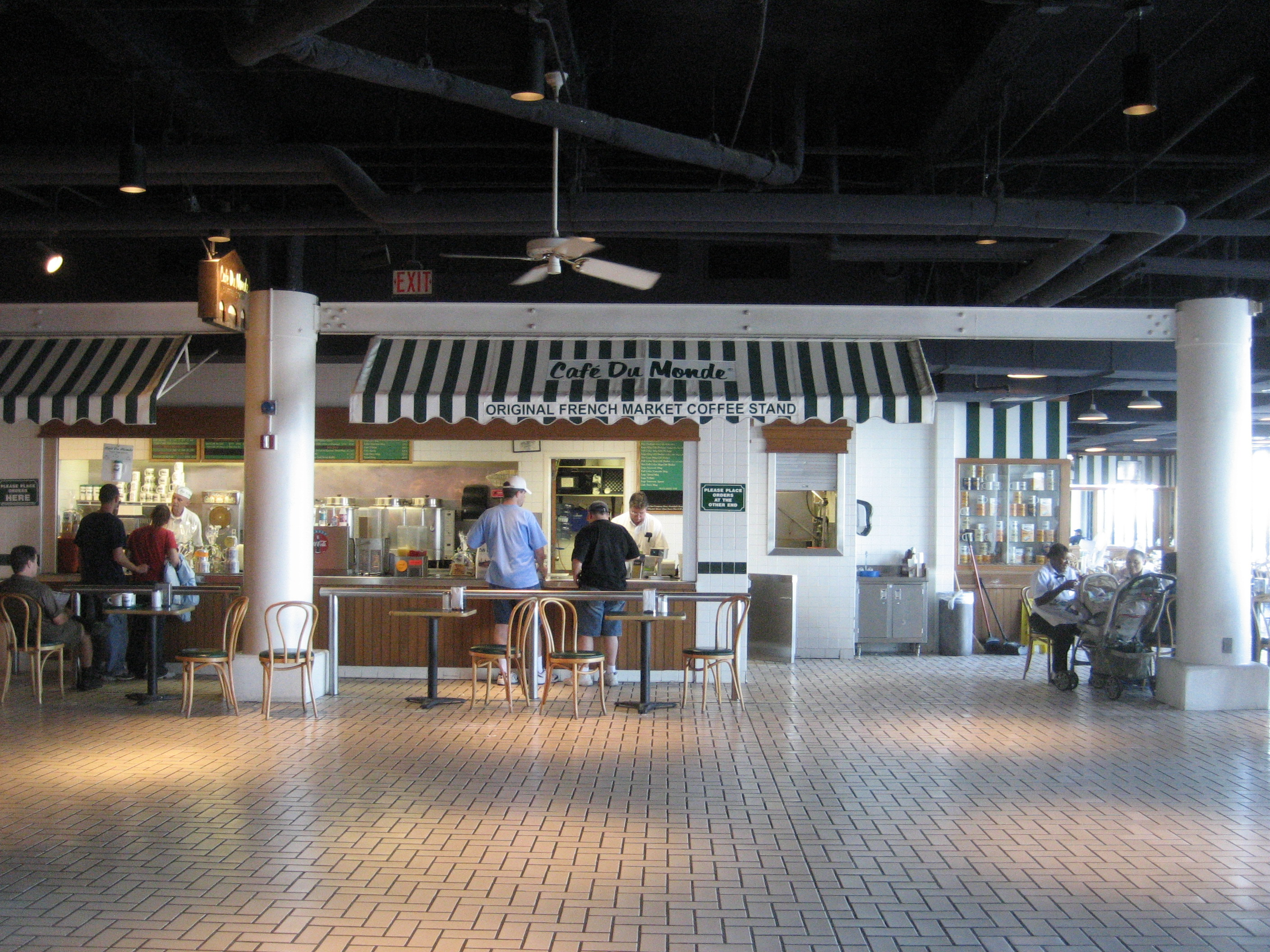
Cafe Du Monde (October 2007)

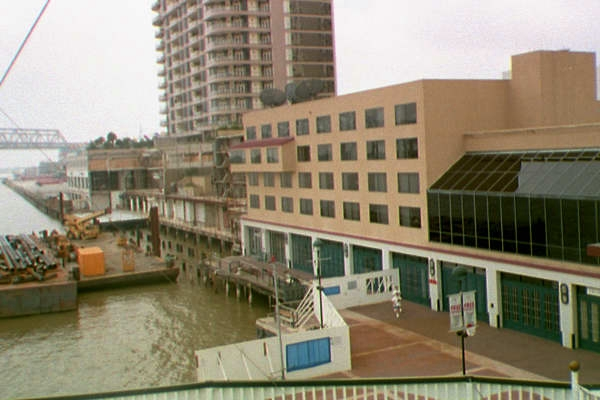
Waterfront view in June 1997 shows damage caused by the Bright Field collision

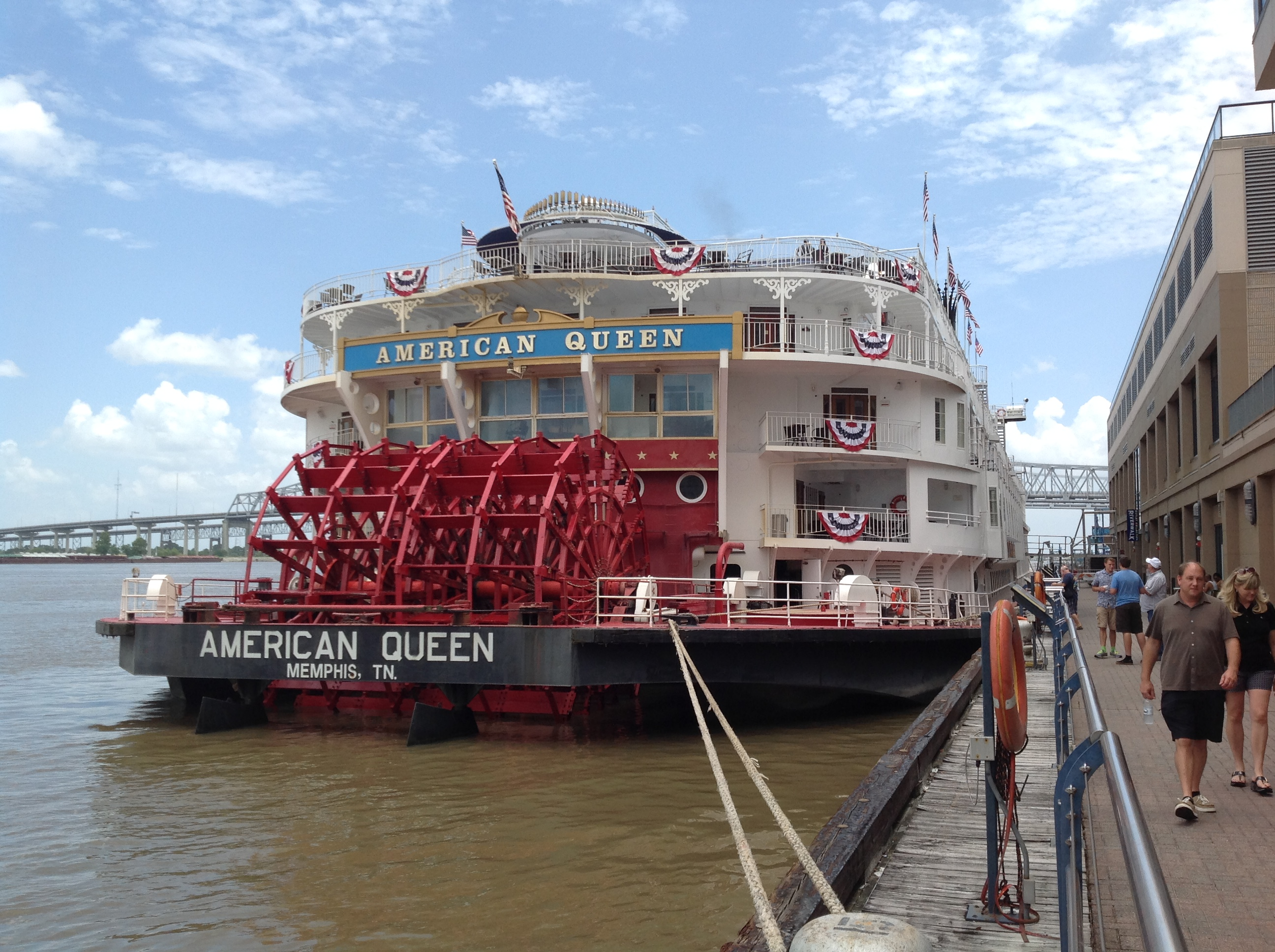
American Queen docked at Riverwalk Outlets in June 2015
