= Enterprise Community Partners =

American nonprofit organization

- Predecessors: Enterprise Foundation; The Rouse Company (smaller city and international festival marketplaces only)
- Founded: 1982
- Headquarters: United States
- Key people: James W. Rouse (Founder), Shaun Donovan (President and Chief Executive Officer, Enterprise Community Partners), Jacqueline Waggoner (President, Solutions Division), Lori Chatman (President, Capital Division), Christine Madigan (President, Community Development Division), Ronald J. Terwilliger (Chairman, Enterprise Community Partners Board of Trustees; Vice Chairman, Enterprise Community Investment Board of Directors)
- Revenue: 63,023,326 United States dollar (2017)
- Total assets: 874,866,488 United States dollar (2022)
- Subsidiaries: Enterprise Community Investment (for-profit); Enterprise Homes (non-profit); Enterprise Community Asset Management (for-profit); Bellwether Enterprise (for-profit); Enterprise Community Loan Fund (non-profit); Enterprise Development Company (smaller city festival marketplaces and international festival marketplaces)
- Website: www.enterprisecommunity.org

Enterprise Community Partners, formerly the Enterprise Foundation, is an American nonprofit. Its goals are to increase housing supply, advance racial equity and build resilience and upward mobility. Founded in 1982 by developer/philanthropist James W. Rouse and his wife Patty, Enterprise has worked with community-based nonprofit organizations to develop 951,000 homes, investing $64 billion throughout the United States. The organization works in more than 800 communities and in collaboration with thousands of partners in the nonprofit, public and for-profit sectors. Affordable housing advocate and attorney Priscilla Almodovar served as president and chief executive officer of Enterprise from September 2019 to December 2022. Shaun Donovan is the current CEO of Enterprise Community Partners.

== History ==
In 1972, three members of the Church of the Saviour—Terry Flood, Barbara Moore and Carolyn Banker—wanted to create low-income housing in the Adams Morgan neighborhood of D.C. With no development, financial or construction experience, they put down a non-refundable deposit to purchase the Ritz and Mozart apartment buildings. Their commitment won over James Rouse, CEO of The Rouse Company and he helped them secure $625,000 to complete the transaction and $125,000 toward the cost of rehabilitation.

In 1981, the experience inspired Jim Rouse to found Robin Hood Inc. based in one of Rouse's American City buildings in Columbia, Maryland. The company was renamed to Jubilee Housing to help with fundraising efforts. Jubilee Housing provided the launchpad for Jim and Patty Rouse to start the Enterprise Foundation in 1982. In 2005, it was renamed Enterprise Community Partners.

In 1984, Jim Rouse was soliciting business representing both Rouse Company as chief executive officer and Enterprise Development as president. The Rouse Company board of directors asked Jim Rouse to leave as CEO of the Rouse Company and his position in Enterprise Development which ended his involvement with the company he founded.

In 2012 ECP bought a majority interest in Bellwether Real Estate Capital, LLC, a for-profit lender. After the acquisition Bellwether shifted its focus to afforable housing loans and became one of 24 delegated underwriters for Fannie Mae. This status allowed Bellweher to make loans for trailer parks without getting approval from Fannie Mae. Bellwhether consistently made loans to Havenpark Communities, a company particapting in the wave of private sector investments in trailer parks, raising rents and driving out tenants. Other partipants in the fair housing community raised objections to ECP.

== Enterprise Green Communities ==
Enterprise Green Communities is the nation's only national green building program designed explicitly for green affordable housing construction. The 2020 Green Communities Criteria is the latest version of the guidelines, first introduced in 2005. Updates include a Path to Zero Energy, new water-quality standards, and a new approach to affordable housing in rural areas, tribal communities and small towns.

== See also ==
- Green building
- NeighborWorks America
- Low-Income Housing Tax Credit
- New Markets Tax Credits
