= Festival marketplace =

American shopping market in European-style

A festival marketplace is a shopping market in the United States which uses a mix of local tenants instead of regional or national chain stores, shop stalls and common areas to energize the space, and uncomplicated architectural ornaments to highlight the goods. Festival marketplaces were a leading strategy for revitalization of downtowns in American cities during the 1970s and 1980s.

== List of festival marketplaces ==
Malls that are italicized are defunct. Malls with an asterisk (*) are still in operation as a shopping center, but no longer as a festival marketplace.

- Aloha Tower Marketplace* — Honolulu, Hawaii
- Arizona Center* — Phoenix, Arizona
- Bandana Square — Saint Paul, Minnesota
- The Brokerage – Baltimore, Maryland
- Bayside Marketplace — Miami, Florida
- Broadway Market – Baltimore, Maryland
- Cambridgeside Galleria — Cambridge, Massachusetts
- Canalside — Buffalo, New York
- Catfish Town — Baton Rouge, Louisiana
- Church Street Station Exchange — Orlando, Florida
- The Continent — Columbus, Ohio
- Cray Plaza — Saint Paul, Minnesota
- Faneuil Hall Marketplace — Boston, Massachusetts
- Festival Market — Lexington, Kentucky
- Fountain Square — Nashville, Tennessee
- Ghirardelli Square — San Francisco, California
- Harborplace — Baltimore, Maryland
- The Shoppes at Harbour Island - Tampa, Florida
- The Fishmarket – Baltimore, Maryland
- Harbourside Shopping Centre – Sydney, Australia
- Jack London Square — Oakland, California
- Jackson Brewery — New Orleans, Louisiana
- Jacksonville Landing — Jacksonville, Florida
- McCamly Place – Battle Creek, Michigan
- Mercado Mediterranean Shopping Village — Orlando, Florida
- Navy Pier — Chicago, Illinois
- Old Post Office Pavilion — Washington, D.C.
- Pier 39 — San Francisco, California
- Portside Festival Marketplace — Toledo, Ohio
- The Outlet Collection at Riverwalk* — New Orleans, Louisiana
- Rainbow Centre Factory Outlet – Niagara Falls, New York
- The Shops at National Place – Washington, D.C.
  - eat at National Place
- 6th Street Marketplace — Richmond, Virginia
- South Street Seaport Festival Marketplace (Pier 17 Pavilion and Fulton Market Building)— Manhattan, New York City
- Saint Anthony Main — Minneapolis, Minnesota
- St. Louis Union Station — St. Louis, Missouri
- Station Square — Pittsburgh, Pennsylvania
- Seminole Paradise – Hollywood, Florida
- Tower City Center — Cleveland, Ohio
- Trolley Square — Salt Lake City, Utah
- Underground Atlanta — Atlanta, Georgia
- Union Station — Indianapolis, Indiana
- Union Station — Washington, D.C.
- Water Street Pavilion — Flint, Michigan
- Waterside Festival Marketplace — Norfolk, Virginia
- West End Marketplace — Dallas, Texas
- Westfield Horton Plaza — San Diego, California
- Yamhill Marketplace - Portland, Oregon

== See also ==
- Lifestyle center (retail)
