= James Rouse =

American real estate developer (1914–1996)

James Wilson Rouse
- Rouse in 1987
- Born: Wilson Richardson Rouse; April 26, 1914; Easton, Maryland, U.S.
- Died: April 9, 1996 (aged 81); Columbia, Maryland, U.S.
- Occupation: Real estate developer
- Spouse(s): Elizabeth Jamieson Winstead (m. 1941; div. 1973) Myrtle Patricia Traugott (m. 1974)
- Children: 3
- Parents: Willard Goldsmith Rouse; Lydia Robinson Rouse
- Relatives: Willard Rouse II (brother); Edward Norton (grandson); Willard Rouse (nephew)

James Wilson Rouse (April 26, 1914 – April 9, 1996), born Wilson Richardson Rouse, was an American businessman and founder of The Rouse Company. Rouse was a pioneering American real estate developer, urban planner, civic activist, and later, free enterprise-based philanthropist. He received the Presidential Medal of Freedom, the highest civilian award, for his lifetime achievements.

== Early life and education ==
James "Jim" Rouse (legally born Wilson Richardson Rouse, but called "Jim" from birth) was born in Easton, Maryland, to Lydia Agnes (née Robinson) and Willard Goldsmith Rouse, a canned-foods broker. Rouse would describe his father as "the most brilliant man I have ever known," and his mother as "a very lovely, warm woman, very much a leader in the community, very loved by everyone."

Willard Rouse, a lawyer trained at Johns Hopkins University, and veteran of the Spanish-American War, once ran for state's attorney for Harford County. When he lost, the Rouse family moved from Bel Air, Maryland, to Easton. Rouse grew up in Easton (which at the time had a population of 5,000) on a well-to-do street on the edge of town. At the time, Talbot County was a place marked by racial inequality and "Lost Cause" Confederate sympathy, and was struggling to adapt from its historic agrarian roots.

Rouse was taught at home by his mother until second grade when he transferred to a public school. In 1930, Rouse's father died of bladder cancer and his mother of heart failure. His childhood home was foreclosed upon. After public high school, where he received mediocre grades, his brother Bill paid for him to attend the private preparatory Tome School in Port Deposit, Maryland, for a year.

Facing money problems and unable to continue at the Tome School, the Rouse family sought a way for him to attend college by appealing to his oldest sister, who had married a United States Navy officer stationed in Hawaii. Rouse declared himself his sister's dependent and, with Navy connections now secured, was thereby able to attend the University of Hawaiʻi at Mānoa at a greatly reduced cost. Rouse later attended the University of Virginia. He declared his major as political science and waited tables at a local boarding house. Because he was unable to cover the gap between his scholarship and his remaining expenses, he left Charlottesville and moved to Baltimore to try to make it on his own.

== Career ==
He found a job parking cars at the St. Paul Garage for one year. He later remarked that he got the job even though he could not drive, and had convinced his foreman to teach him rather than fire him. In May 1935, Rouse wrote Millard Tydings, who found him a position with the Federal Housing Administration as a clerk specializing in completing FHA loans to eastern Maryland banks. Although he had only two years of undergraduate college on his transcript, in the 1930s that was enough to qualify for law school. He borrowed money in March 1936 from Guy Hollyday who was a loan officer with the Title Guarantee and Trust Company seeking FHA loan guarantees and attended classes three nights a week at the University of Maryland School of Law. He was hired at age 22 by his mentor Hollyday.

While working at the FHA during the New Deal, Rouse was tasked with enforcing racially discriminatory guidelines. Rouse used antisemitic quotas when building in the Roland Park neighborhood of Baltimore. In 1951, Rouse enforced a quota of no more than 12% Jewish residents for the Maryland Apartment in north Baltimore until 75% of the apartments were rented.

Rouse graduated in 1937 and in 1939 left the FHA and became partner with Hunter Moss at a mortgage banking firm called the Moss-Rouse Company funded by a $20,000 loan from Moss's sister, which would eventually become the Rouse Company. The company would specialize in FHA-backed loans, and hired Churchill G. Carey from Connecticut General, with his former company providing loan capital to Moss-Rouse. Both Moss and Rouse served during WWII, with Moss joining the Marines and Rouse the Navy. Rouse was able to defer duty while his wife was pregnant, shipping out to Hawaii to work on John Henry Towers staff on July 4, 1942. Rouse returned from the war and went back to work with Moss, using his gambling assets. By 1951, the Moss-Rouse Company had become the largest mortgage banking company in the state of Maryland. In 1954, the two partners split, with Moss summarizing the split this way: "[Rouse] was a person who liked to do things in a big way. I liked the smaller company. So we split up."

As he was growing his business, Rouse pursued various civic activities. He co-founded the Citizens Planning and Housing Association (CPHA) and became involved in Baltimore, Maryland's efforts to rehabilitate its decayed housing stock through The Baltimore Plan. The national publicity of this program led to his participation in Dwight D. Eisenhower's National Housing Task Force starting in 1953. He introduced (or at least helped popularize) the term "urban renewal" to describe the series of recommendations made by that task force.

=== Shopping malls ===
In 1958, Rouse built Harundale Mall in Glen Burnie, Maryland, the first enclosed shopping center east of the Mississippi River and the first built by a real estate developer. His company used the term "mall" to describe the development, which was an alternative to the more typical strip malls usually built in the suburbs (the "mall" in "strip mall" came into usage later, after the enclosed mall had been popularized by Rouse's company). Although many now attribute the rise of the shopping mall to the decline of the American downtown core, Rouse's focus at the time was on the introduction of malls as a form of town center for the suburbs.

His company became an active developer and manager of shopping center and mall properties, even as he shifted focus to new projects which eventually included planned communities and festival marketplaces.

In late 1973, the Columbia project took a downturn as Maryland land developers such as Joel Kline, and politicians such as Governor Marvin Mandel, and Vice President Spiro Agnew were indicted on various charges of corruption related to land speculation. Rouse was indicted for donations to Mandel's 1974 campaign which violated campaign contribution limits, but the charges were dropped because they had been brought outside the one-year limit.

Harundale Mall has since been replaced by Harundale Plaza in 1999, due to severe decline and an inability to compete with the newer Marley Station Mall. The signature "rock" from Harundale Mall—which explains the developer (Rouse), architect (RTKL), and opening date—is now at Harundale Plaza.

=== Planned communities ===
In the 1960s Rouse turned his focus to planned communities. After engaging in a planning exercise for the Pocantico Hills estate of the Rockefellers, Rouse constructed his first planned residential development: the Village of Cross Keys in Baltimore. On June 16, 1961, Rouse bought 68 acres (280,000 m^{2}) inside the city from the Baltimore Country Club for $25,000 an acre. Rouse excitedly proclaimed that this undertaking "will be the largest, and potentially most important development in the history of Baltimore." Rouse hoped that he could bring to the residential field "some of the fresh thinking, good taste and high standards which we believe have marked our shopping center developments."

Familiar with bad housing in Baltimore and Washington, D.C., Rouse now had an opportunity to demonstrate what housing within a city's borders could be like. "There is a real need for residential development," he said, "in which there is a strong sense of community; a need to feed into the city some of the atmosphere and pace of the small town and village; a need to create a community which can meet as many as possible of the needs of the people who live there; which can bring these people into natural contact with one another; which can produce out of these relationships a spirit and feeling of neighborliness and a rich sense of belonging to a community." In a city that practiced strict racial segregation, Rouse intended Cross Keys to be open to all who could afford to live there. The development was a mixture of townhouses, garden apartments, a high-rise apartment house designed by Frank Gehry, stores grouped around a village square, and an office complex. By 1970, the Village of Cross Keys had become among the most desirable places to live in the Baltimore area.

While Cross Keys was still under construction, Rouse decided to build a whole new "city", which led to the creation of Columbia, Maryland, between Baltimore and Washington, D.C. For the undertaking that would become Columbia, Rouse turned to his partner in previous projects, the Connecticut General Life Insurance Company ("CG"). At a meeting at company headquarters in Hartford, Rouse made his pitch to CG's top real estate and mortgage people and the company's chairman of the board, Frazar B. Wilde. The questioning was mostly negative, until Wilde joined in. He expressed the view that CG couldn't lose. If Rouse's project did not succeed, the land could always be sold, and probably for a higher price than what it cost.

The land for the new city would be owned by a subsidiary called Howard Research and Development Corporation. CG would own half of that corporation and Rouse's corporation the other half. Rouse would be responsible for the management of the acquired land and for preparing a master plan for development. CG also put up some of the money for Columbia's infrastructure. The rest was supplied by Teachers Insurance and Annuity Association and the Chase Manhattan Bank.

By the end of the summer of 1963 close to 14,000 acres (57 km^{2}) of Howard County farmland had been acquired, and the time was at hand to begin planning what to do with it. Rouse wanted to hear from a wide assortment of experts and scholars. He brought together an assemblage which became known as "The Work Group." It consisted of top people in health, family life, education, recreation, government, transportation, and employment. Ultimately emerging was the idea that the new city should be a real multi-faceted city, not a bedroom suburb. It should be possible for its residents to find everything they needed right there—jobs, education, recreation, health care, and any other necessity.

Rouse was not reluctant to bring up his home town of Easton as a model for Columbia. Consensus formed around the idea that the basic subdivision within the new city should be the village, a unit of 10,000 to 15,000 people. This number was thought to be the most likely to foster a local feeling of identification: for merchants to get to know their customers, ministers their memberships, and teachers their pupils and parents.

Within the city, there would be 12 villages. Each village would have a central gathering place where people of different income levels and types of housing would cross paths and mix. Each village would have a middle school and a high school, a teen center, a supermarket, a library, a hospital, an auditorium, offices, restaurants, some specialty shops, and a few larger recreational facilities. It also would have a multi-denominational house of worship known as an "interfaith center" based on the Gordon Cosby's Ecumenical Church of the Savior called the Kittamaqundi Community. The hope was that one building would be used by several religions.

In addition to the villages there would be a core area that would function as the new city's "downtown." Here would be the main cluster of retail stores (arranged as a mall), a hotel and conference center, a hospital, movie theaters and a concert hall, a community college, and branches of the Maryland Institute College of Art and the Peabody Conservatory of Music.

The main entertainment area was to be known as Tivoli, after the entertainment area in Copenhagen. Early on, Rouse said that he hoped Tivoli would be a place "where, under the benign influence of having fun and relaxing in familiar ways, people would have opportunities, especially attractive and conveniently presented, for discovering new ways to enjoy their free time—new foods, new visual and tactile aesthetic experiences, even new social relations." Rouse wanted the town center in Columbia to provide the most comprehensive range of recreational activities and services that had ever been contemplated in a new town.

The recession of the 1970s hit Columbia hard, and CG had to refinance the project, reducing The Rouse Company's stake. CG later pulled out of the project completely in 1985, but by that time it had returned to profitability.

=== Festival marketplaces ===
Rouse shifted focus from suburban retail to urban malls, which he called "festival marketplaces," of which the Faneuil Hall Marketplace was the first and most successful example. Completed in 1976, and partly funded with assistance from the United States Department of Housing and Urban Development, the Faneuil Hall Marketplace (comprising Quincy Market and other spaces adjacent to Boston's Faneuil Hall) was designed by architect Benjamin C. Thompson and was a financial success, an act of historic preservation, and an anchor for urban revitalization. Later the Boston Museum of Fine Arts established an annex at the Quincy Market, and the mall generated more foot traffic than the museum. Initially, there were critics who predicted the project would fail, while others dismissed its early success as a fad. Calvin Trillin and Peter Hall each invoked Disneyland in their claims that Faneuil Hall Marketplace was an example of fake urbanism. Robert Campbell, an architecture critic, rejected this kind of criticism as snobbery, and claimed that the festival marketplace was effective at getting people out of their cars and getting them to experience the city. In his planning for the project, Rouse imagined that people would not just shop, that they would also be entertained. However, he later claimed that he had not anticipated its popularity as a tour bus destination.

Other examples of Rouse Company "festival marketplace" developments include South Street Seaport in New York City, The Gallery at Market East, in Philadelphia, Harborplace in Baltimore, St. Louis Union Station in St. Louis, Downtown Portland's Pioneer Place, and the Riverwalk Marketplace of New Orleans. The early festival marketplaces like Faneuil Hall and Harborplace led TIME magazine to dub Rouse "the man who made cities fun again."

=== Retirement ===
After 40 years at the Rouse Company, Rouse retired from day-to-day management in 1979. Soon afterwards, he and his wife founded the Enterprise Community Partners, a not-for-profit foundation funded in part by a for-profit subsidiary, The Enterprise Development Company, and focused on seeding partnerships with community groups that would address the need for affordable housing and associated social services for poor neighborhoods. In 1984, Jim Rouse was soliciting business representing both Rouse Company as CEO and Enterprise Development as president. The Rouse Company board of directors asked Jim Rouse to leave as CEO of the Rouse Company and his position in Enterprise Development which ended his involvement with the company he founded.

Rouse was inducted into the Junior Achievement U.S. Business Hall of Fame in 1981. In 1988, Rouse was awarded the second Honor Award from the National Building Museum.

The Rouse Theatre in Wilde Lake High School is named after James. In May 2006, an approximately four-mile stretch of Maryland Route 175 between Interstate 95 and U.S. Route 29 in Columbia, Maryland, was named after Rouse and his wife, Patty. The Jim Rouse Visionary Center opened in 2006 in a formerly contaminated Whiskey Warehouse in Baltimore.

== Awards ==
In 1978, Rouse received the S. Roger Horchow Award for Greatest Public Service by a Private Citizen, an award given out annually by Jefferson Awards.

In 1981, Rouse received the Golden Plate Award of the American Academy of Achievement.

In 1995, Rouse was awarded the Presidential Medal of Freedom by President Bill Clinton.

== Personal life ==
James Rouse's first wife was Elizabeth Jamieson "Libby" (née Winstead) whom he married on May 3, 1941. His daughter Robin is the mother of actor Edward Norton. His son Jim applied for conscientious objector status during the Vietnam War with his father's support. In May 1970, Rouse posted full page anti-war ads in The Washington Post and later The New York Times that upset the new Nixon administration. Rouse separated from Libby in 1973, and married Myrtle Patricia "Patty" Traugott, from Norfolk, Virginia, in November 1974. He died of amyotrophic lateral sclerosis on April 9, 1996. Patty Rouse died on March 5, 2012.

Rouse's nephew, Willard Rouse III, was also a real estate developer.

== Homage ==
His grandson Edward Norton, upon graduating from Yale University in 1991, moved to Japan to work for the Rouses' foundation. Later, Norton directed the film Motherless Brooklyn, released in 2019, "as an homage to the things [James Rouse] cared about". In particular, the movie denounces the controversial urbanist Robert Moses, accused of lust for power, questionable ethics, vindictiveness, and racism.
