= Widowed Services Program =

Widowed Services Program was 1970s era movement to help widowed homemakers make a living for themselves and their family after the passing of the head of the household.

== In Oregon ==
The Widowed Services Program was founded in Oregon by University of Oregon graduate Hazel Foss. Foss had recently lost her husband and had found herself having to provide for her family. She had no advanced skills at the time beyond the skills of a homemaker. She saw a need for services to be provided to widows and created a program to help these widows.

She joined forces with Tish Sommers and Laurie Shields of the National Alliance for Displaced Homemakers and State Representative Nancie Fadeley of the Oregon House of Representatives to begin the Oregon State displaced homemaker advocacy movement in 1976-1977.

Soon, the Oregon State Legislature passed the Displaced Homemaker Bill, allotting federal funding for a pilot project, making it possible for Foss to expand the program into the Displaced Homemaker Center/ Widowed Services Program. This type of program was the third to be established on a nationally.

The program was able to help around 400 individuals a year. The program primarily aided women, but the services were also open to men who became widowers and displaced homemakers themselves.

The program lasted seven years in Oregon, with fewer and fewer women requesting help each year, both because women’s education was increasing and because more women were already in the workforce.

== Other states ==
The Widowed Services Program has been continued in other states and under other similar names, such as the Widowed Persons Service in Nebraska.

The AARP also runs a Widowed Persons Service.
