= Encore fellowships =

Temporary work placement programs

Encore fellowships are temporary work placement programs designed to help former private sector mid-life careerists transition into encore career work in the social sector. Similar to how a person might apply for an internship with a business prior to applying for a full-time position, this temporary fellowship allows a person to experience non-profit work first-hand without the long-term commitment of a full-time encore career.

== History ==
In recent years, there has been a distinct and growing trend among late-career or retired private-sector employees toward encore careers, or careers in the second half of life in social purpose or non-profit organizations. However, despite the growing popularity of the program, many who would otherwise be either interested in encore careers—either as an encore careerist or as an organization seeking to hire an encore careerist—are unable or unwilling to take part in the movement, often lacking experience, information, or communication between the corporate and the social sectors.

In 2009, a pilot program centered around using temporary fellowships as a means to reduce the difficulties inherent in transitioning between mid-life and encore careers emerged. The Silicon Valley Encore Fellows Program experimented with ten encore fellows, each of whom having formerly worked in high-level positions in various corporate departments, working for six to 12 months in community non-profit organizations. The fellows worked either part- or full-time for a stipend. Based on these results of this pilot program, Encore.org has decided to continue their program in 2010.

== Edward M. Kennedy Serve America Act ==
Encore fellowships were mentioned specifically in an act signed by President Barack Obama known as the Edward M. Kennedy Serve America Act. In Section 198C, the bill proposes federal encore fellowships for citizens age 55 or older. The bill allows for 10 encore fellowships per state.

== External Resources ==
- Encore fellowships
