= Older Women's League =

American women's rights organization

- Formation: 1980
- Dissolved: March 15, 2017; 9 years ago
- Purpose: Women's rights, fighting ageism
- Headquarters: Washington, D.C., U.S.
- President: Margaret Hellie Huyck, Ph.D.
- Vice President: Janet Pitt
- Treasurer: Joan Bernstein, J.D.
- Website: owl-national.org

OWL - The Voice of Women 40+ was founded as the Older Women's League by Tish Sommers and Laurie Shields, following the White House Mini-Conference on Older Women in Des Moines, Iowa in October 1980. The conference, called "Growing Numbers, Growing Force," addressed three main concerns: ensuring adequate income, health concerns of older women, and quality of life and the impact of aging. About 200 women participants stayed on after the conference, at their own expense, to start the Older Women's League, an outgrowth of the Older Women's League Educational Fund, founded by Tish Sommers and Laurie Shields, and named Sommers as the first president of OWL.

In March 2017, it was reported that the national organization had decided to disband, but local chapters may continue to function under the OWL name or possibly another name.

== Mission ==
OWL was a nonpartisan, nonprofit, national membership organization headquartered in Washington, DC, that advocated for the estimated 78 million women in the U.S. who are age 40 and over. Its core issues were economic and retirement security, encore careers and entrepreneurship, wellness, cost-effective and comprehensive health care, Social Security, and long-term care.

== Advocacy ==
Advocacy was carried out through:

- Educational initiatives on issues such as workforce challenges, access to healthcare and long-term care, and strengthening Social Security
- Reports and other publications offering policy recommendations and best practices
- Briefings for congressional staff, media, and the public
- Collaborations with other organizations on common issues
- Updates on policies and proposals

Membership dues and donations, and grants from foundations and corporations were OWL’s prime funding sources.

OWL has successfully advocated for legislation, including the Retirement Equity Act and a law allowing widows to continue using their spouses' health insurance. In the 1980s, OWL formed a planning group with the National Women's Health Network, the American Association of University Women, the National Black Women's Health Project and other organizations to establish a women's agenda for health care reform. In 1990, OWL allowed the newly created Campaign for Women's Health to have space in its Washington D.C. offices.
