= Quincy Market =

Marketplace in Boston, Massachusetts

- U.S. National Register of Historic Places
- U.S. National Historic Landmark
- Boston Landmark
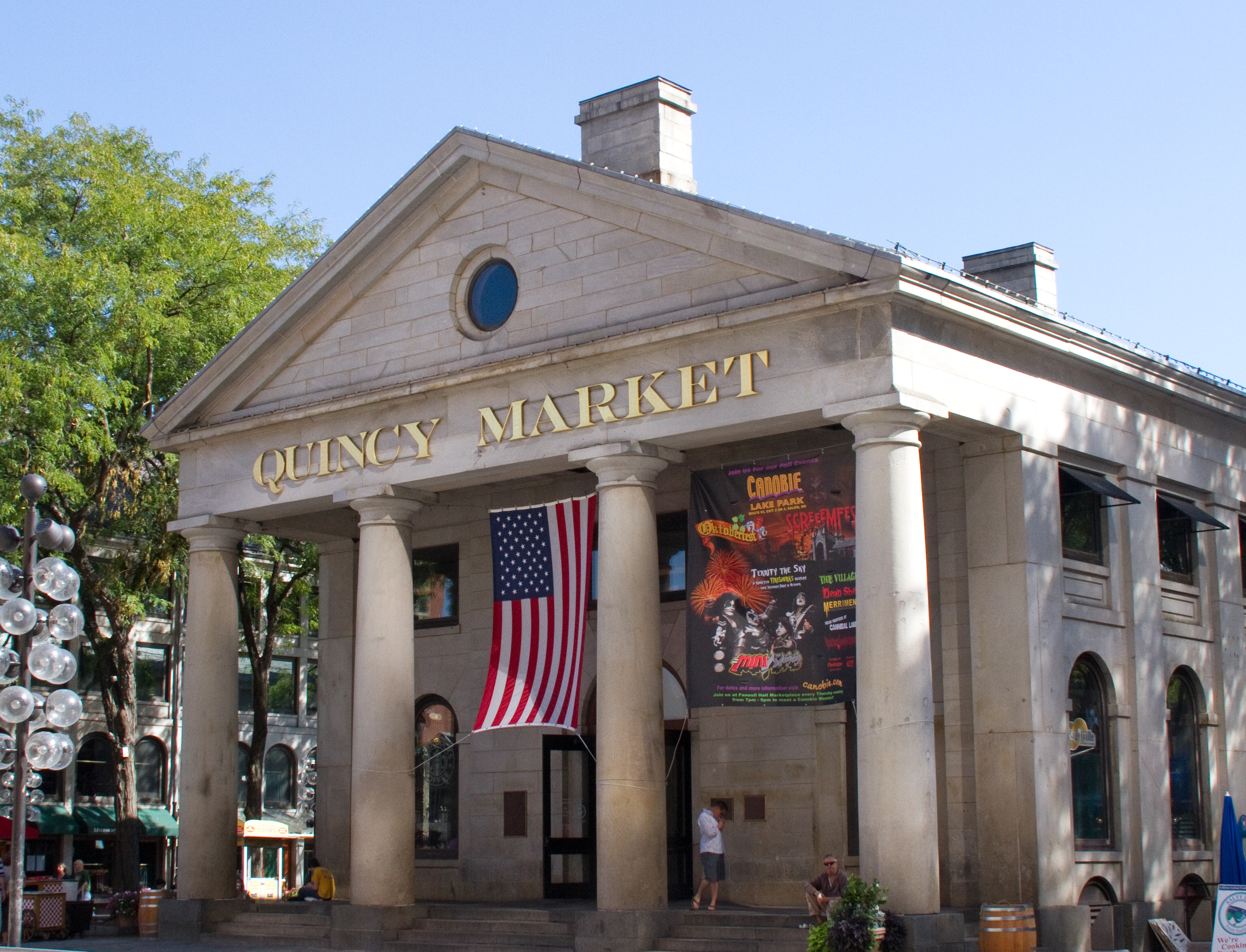
- The eastern portico of the central Quincy Market building (September 2011)

- Location within Boston Location within Massachusetts Location within the United States
- Interactive map of Quincy Market
- Location: Boston, Massachusetts, US
- Coordinates: 42°21′36″N 71°03′18″W
- Built: 1824–1826
- Architect: Alexander Parris
- Architectural style: Greek Revival
- NRHP reference No.: 66000784

Significant dates
- Added to NRHP: November 13, 1966
- Designated NHL: November 13, 1966
- Designated BOSL: May 28, 1996 (central building); April 23, 2024 (North and South Markets)

Quincy Market (originally Faneuil Hall Market) is a historic marketplace complex in Downtown Boston, Massachusetts, United States. Located at Merchants Row next to Faneuil Hall, it consists of three buildings constructed in 1826 and designed by Alexander Parris. The central two-story building (sometimes known as Quincy Market) is flanked by the 4 1/2-story North and South Markets, each containing multiple storefront units. Since 1976, Quincy Market has been the Faneuil Hall Marketplace, a festival marketplace. The buildings are designated as a National Historic Landmark and as Boston Landmarks.

The complex's namesake, Boston mayor Josiah Quincy, began efforts to replace Faneuil Hall's market in 1823. The city government constructed the central building, while the North and South Market units were owned and developed by individual merchants. The complex opened on August 26, 1826, with food stalls, dry-goods stores, outdoor vendors, and exhibition space. Over the years, all three buildings were adapted for different tenants and uses. The North and South Market units were gradually resold and expanded, while the central building was renovated in the 1920s and 1930s.

By the mid-20th century, calls to replace or redevelop the rundown market prompted the Boston Redevelopment Authority (BRA) to acquire much of the complex in the 1960s. After an early redevelopment plan fell through, The Rouse Company leased Quincy Market, and James Rouse and Benjamin Thompson began renovating it in 1972. The marketplace, reopened in stages between 1976 and 1978, was both profitable and popular. Major brands began replacing smaller stores in the 1980s, and the complex was renovated in the 1990s and 2000s. Ashkenazy Acquisition took over operation in 2011 and made additional modifications, and J. Safra began operating the complex in 2024.

All three buildings are oriented east–west, separated by streets. The central building is made of granite, with a domed middle section, two wings, and porticoes at each end. Inside are a first-floor passageway connecting the porticoes, along with stores and a double-height rotunda. The North and South Markets have simpler brick and granite facades, which share design details such as trabeated window openings. These buildings have stores below and offices above. The structures included uncommon structural features for their time, which were emulated in other buildings, and the architecture and site layout have been praised over the years. The redevelopment, lauded for its preservation efforts, inspired similar marketplaces elsewhere.

== Site ==
Quincy Market is located at Merchants Row in Downtown Boston, Massachusetts, United States. It is on the west side of Commercial Street, between Clinton Street to the north and Chatham Street to the south. The complex includes a central building flanked by the North and South Market buildings, which all occupy a single land lot without an address number. Quincy Market is a stop on the Freedom Trail, a path connecting historic sites in Boston.

Immediately west of the central building is Faneuil Hall, beyond which are Boston City Hall and Boston City Hall Plaza. A seven-story building sits west of the South Market, facing Faneuil Hall. One block to the south is the Boston Custom House, while to the north are the Blackstone Block Historic District and Haymarket. East of Commercial Street is Marketplace Center, a curved three-story building with a granite facade, which is bisected by a glass-roofed passageway extending east toward the waterfront. Marketplace Center adjoins the base of 200 State Street, a 26-story office tower. A storage and trash compactor serving the complex is near Commercial Street, and a multilevel parking garage is next to the North Market.

The complex occupies filled land that was originally part of a marshy cove in Boston Harbor. Known as Town Cove, it was fed by a freshwater stream, Mill Creek, which later became a sewage outflow. When Boston was colonized in the early 17th century, Town Cove became the town dock; just before Quincy Market's construction in the 1820s, the site had several wharves. Due to land reclamation to the east, the buildings are no longer adjacent to the waterfront, which has shifted three city blocks eastward. Although the buildings are built on a layer of blue clay, a study from 1969 found that the foundations had not settled at all.

=== Open spaces ===
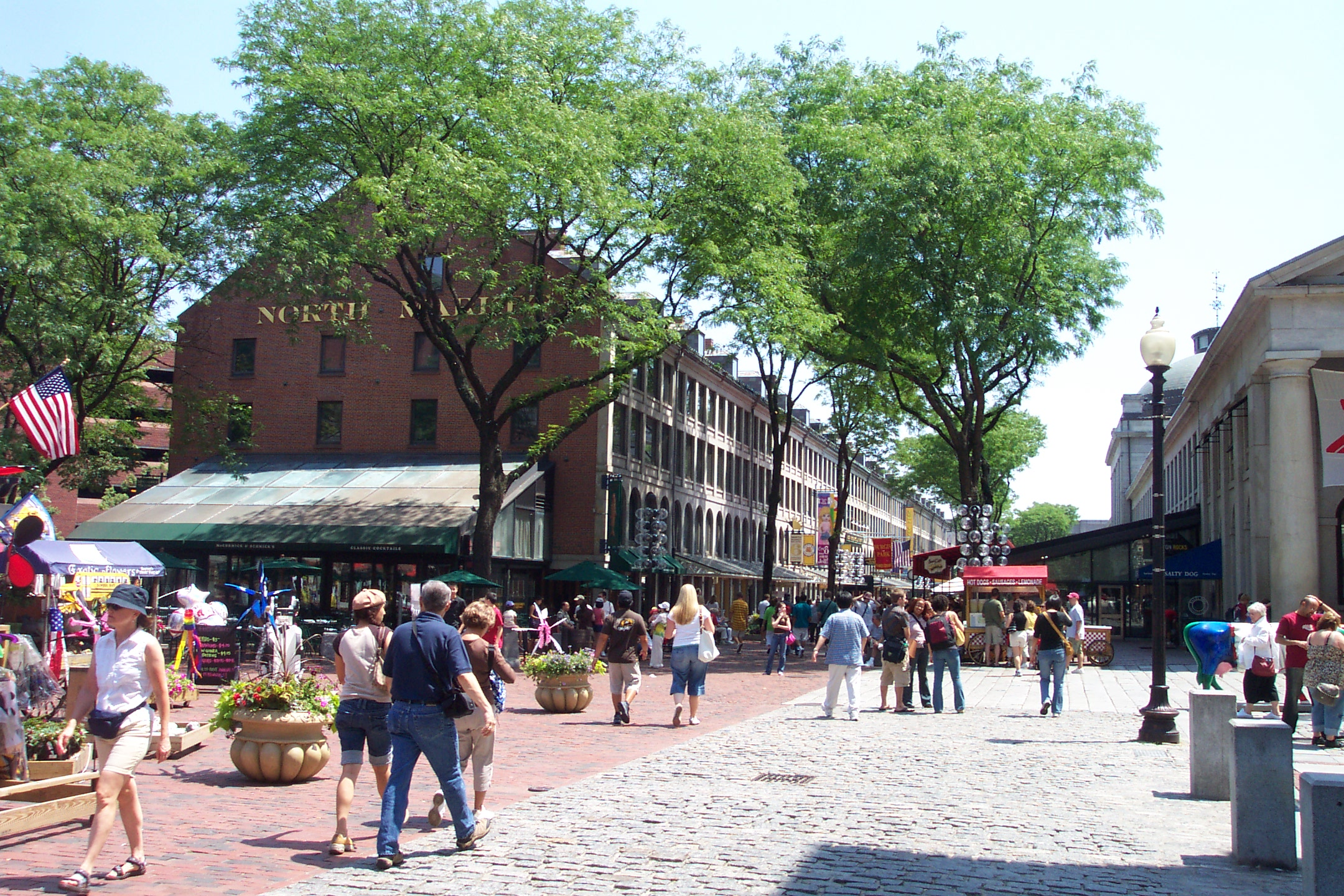
North Market Street (right) and North Market (left), seen in 2006

The buildings are separated by two west–east pedestrian streets: North Market Street, measuring 65 feet (20 m) wide, (Note: Boston Landmarks Commission 1996, p. 20, gives a different width of 60 feet (18 m).) and South Market Street, measuring 102 feet (31 m) wide. Alexander Parris, who designed the entire complex, named the streets. South Market Street is wider because a holdout lot along its route had been acquired using eminent domain, which, when the complex was built, was permitted only for road-construction projects. The streets are paved in granite and Belgian blocks, and South Market Street has brick and granite pavings that continue the design of nearby public spaces. There are plantings, benches, circular granite seats, and lamps throughout, along with allées of honey locust trees. At Quincy Market's western end is Merchants Row, measuring 76 feet (23 m) wide. The complex's eastern boundary, Commercial Street, was originally a 65-foot-wide (20 m) waterfront wharf.

The open spaces are a common venue for street performers and musicians, and pushcart operators sell merchandise there as well. The open spaces have hosted large Christmas trees during the Christmas and holiday season since 1989. From 2012 onward, the Christmas trees have hosted the Blink holiday light show, in which 350,000 LEDs illuminate in different patterns while music is played.

== Development ==
The original Faneuil Hall, constructed as a gift from the businessman Peter Faneuil, opened in 1742 with a marketplace, which was initially poorly patronized. Faneuil Hall's marketplace saw increased use in the late 18th century. By the 1820s, it had become overcrowded, and the town dock's sewage outflow created a bad stench. Some merchants worked in makeshift open-air booths, while others, unable to even reach the market, had to sell their wares on the street. The street grid was crooked, and the market's merchants generally stayed just 20 years.

=== Land acquisition and early plans ===
When Quincy took office in May 1823, he could see overcrowded, dirty streets from his Faneuil Hall office. Shortly afterward, he organized a committee, which suggested erecting a 180-by-36-foot (55 by 11 m) market north of the existing building. The Boston City Council allocated $15,000 (Note: Equivalent to $0.50 million in 2025) for these plans that June. Quincy aimed for a wider-ranging redevelopment of the neighborhood, and the City Council created a committee for the "Extension of Faneuil Hall Market" that July. Quincy, the chairman of the committee, appointed ten city lawmakers, including the architect Asher Benjamin. Over the next four months, the committee met with 30 landowners in a 127,000-square-foot (11,800 m^{2}) area east of Faneuil Hall. Although some landowners were eager to sell their decrepit properties, others held out. Quincy later wrote that it would have taken at least $800,000 (Note: Equivalent to $26.80 million in 2025) to buy out all the landowners.

By December 1823, the committee had drawn up plans for a one-story market and had offered a combined $400,000 to five-sixths of the landowners. (Note: Equivalent to $13.40 million in 2025) The holdouts either refused to sell or demanded compensation that the committee found excessive. Near the center of the site was property owned by fourteen heirs of the Nathan Spear estate, three of whom refused to sell at all. In January 1824, Benjamin publicly presented plans for a one-story, open-air wooden building in the center, flanked to the north and south by 3 1/2-story brick buildings. These would be separated by wide avenues. The central building was positioned asymmetrically so the Spear site was directly in the path of the southern avenue, making it eligible for eminent-domain acquisition. After local residents approved the revised plan that month, the Massachusetts General Court, the commonwealth's legislature, voted in February 1824 to allow eminent domain for non-road purposes.

The committee began acquiring land in early 1825, receiving permission to borrow up to $500,000 (Note: Equivalent to $17.91 million in 2025) to compensate landowners. Many holdouts offered to sell, while others continued to hold out. Some of the remaining holdouts owed back taxes, so the city sent letters to cajole the landlords. Quincy sent eviction notices to property owners in June 1824. By the next month, nearly all the original land had been acquired, along with additional adjacent sites. Benjamin revised the central building's plans, lengthening and enclosing the structure and adding a cellar, and contemporary sources reported in mid-July that work would begin shortly. The structure's perimeter was being surveyed by August 20.

=== Modified plans ===
Meanwhile, successive revisions to the plans called for an increasingly elaborate marketplace, for which a wooden structure was unsuitable. On September 6–7, 1824, the market committee decided to construct a stone structure for $75,000. (Note: Equivalent to $17.91 million in 2025) Benjamin, who found the architect's fee too meager, nominated his mentor Alexander Parris to take over the design in September 1824, though Benjamin remained involved until February 1825. Parris designed a two-story stone central building, and he laid out a new street facing the waterfront to the east, finishing his modifications within three weeks.

To reduce construction expenses, the committee decided to auction the North and South Market sites to merchants, who would construct their own buildings. Merchants Samuel Hammond and Nathan Faxon bought two disconnected North Market lots in late September, and the remaining lots on that block were auctioned on September 29 for a total of over $300,000. (Note: Equivalent to $17.91 million in 2025) Four groups of buyers acquired three-fourths of the lots, including Amos and Abbott Lawrence, who alone owned seven sites. Parris's plans were approved the next week, October 5. Meanwhile, the Spear heirs had been particularly intractable in their refusal to sell their site. As such, Quincy shifted the central building northward, putting the Spear plot in the path of South Market Street, allowing the land to be acquired through eminent domain. The City Council approved the acquisition that December.

=== Construction ===
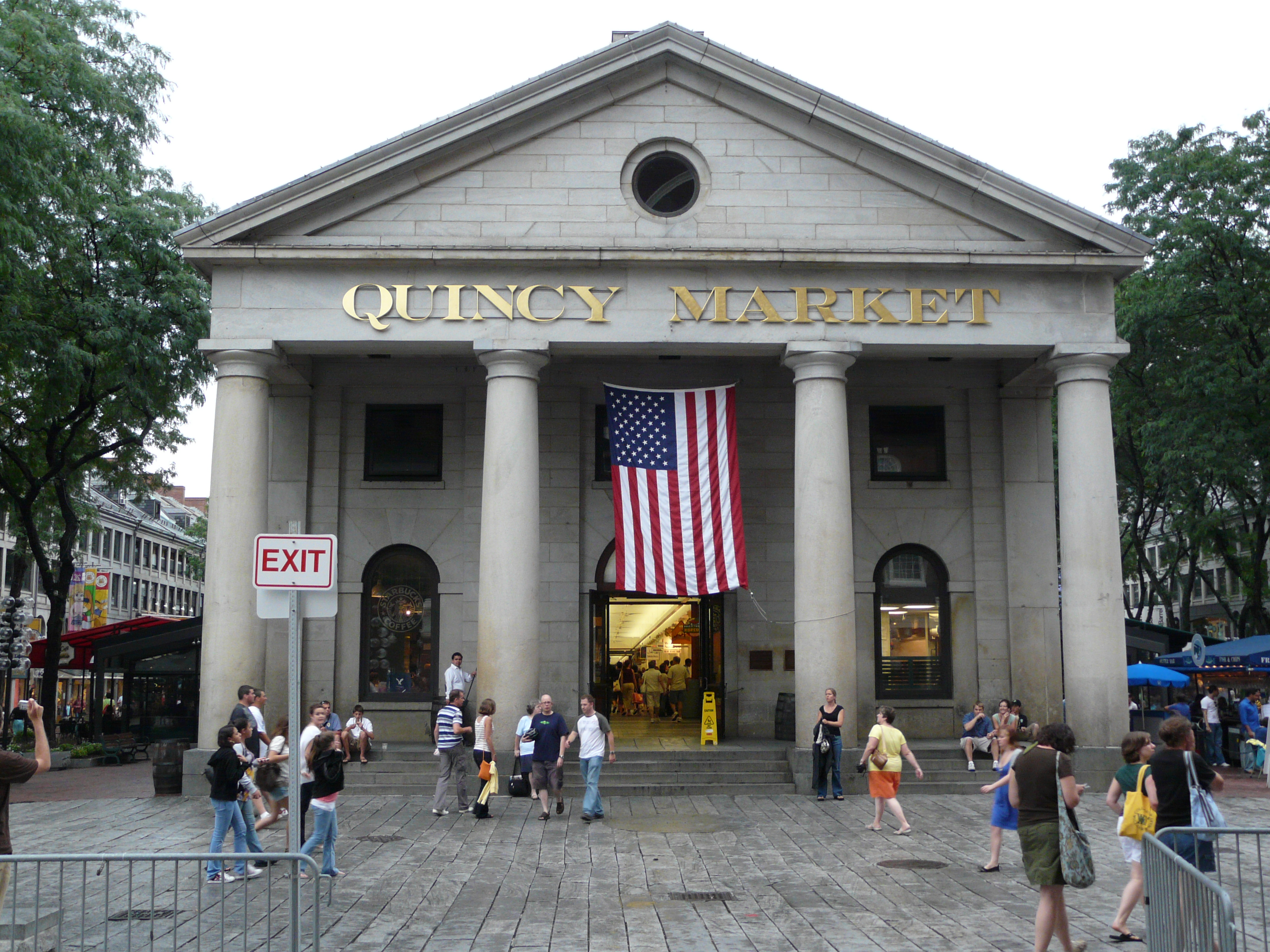
The columns for the central building (pictured here in 2008) were delivered in 1826.

Because land reclamation was not complete, workers initially constructed the foundations underwater at low tide; the portions of the sites on dry land were excavated. The foundations were being completed by early 1825, when the City Council allocated $150,000 (Note: Equivalent to $5.15 million in 2025) for construction. Gridley Bryant, one of the project's three granite contractors, was tasked with shipping granite down the Middlesex Canal that February. The South Market lots were sold on March 31 for over $400,000; (Note: Equivalent to $13.72 million in 2025) most buyers obtained no more than two lots, except for wine merchant John D. Williams, who bought five lots. A formal cornerstone-laying ceremony for the central building took place on April 27, 1825. Other than that, relatively few details of the construction timeline are known.

Work proceeded simultaneously on all three buildings. The North and South Markets were built to precise specifications outlined by Parris, enforced by deed restrictions on each site. The project also included constructing six streets and relocating the shoreline. The city government employed workers for the central building and the streets, while property owners in the North and South Markets hired their own workers. The central building was erected by general contractor Lazel-Perkins, with materials from various suppliers. Thirteen lenders—including banks, organizations, and private stockholders—supplied funding by purchasing stock certificates in the marketplace. The North Market was originally supposed to be finished by July 1, 1825, followed by the South Market exactly one year later. Due to a surveying error, the foundations of the North Market were modified to curve around the preexisting Mill Creek. The city hired a surveyor to examine the quality of construction, and the market committee revised the plans multiple times.

The central building's framework had reached the roof by mid-1825, although granite deliveries had stalled. The granite was cut to precise dimensions, and the central building's monumental columns were carved in one piece and delivered without any steam-powered equipment. The western columns were delivered in August 1825, followed by the eastern columns that October, at which point the North Market's exterior was completed. Details of the design, such as the material used in the coved ceiling, were negotiated during the construction process. After the city government reneged on an earlier plan to inhabit the central building's second floor, the City Council designated that space as an exhibition hall. The central building's completion was delayed by early 1826 due to difficulties in extracting large pieces of granite from Massachusetts quarries, so granite was sourced from other parts of New England.

== Early history ==
=== 19th century ===
==== Opening, 1820s to 1840s ====
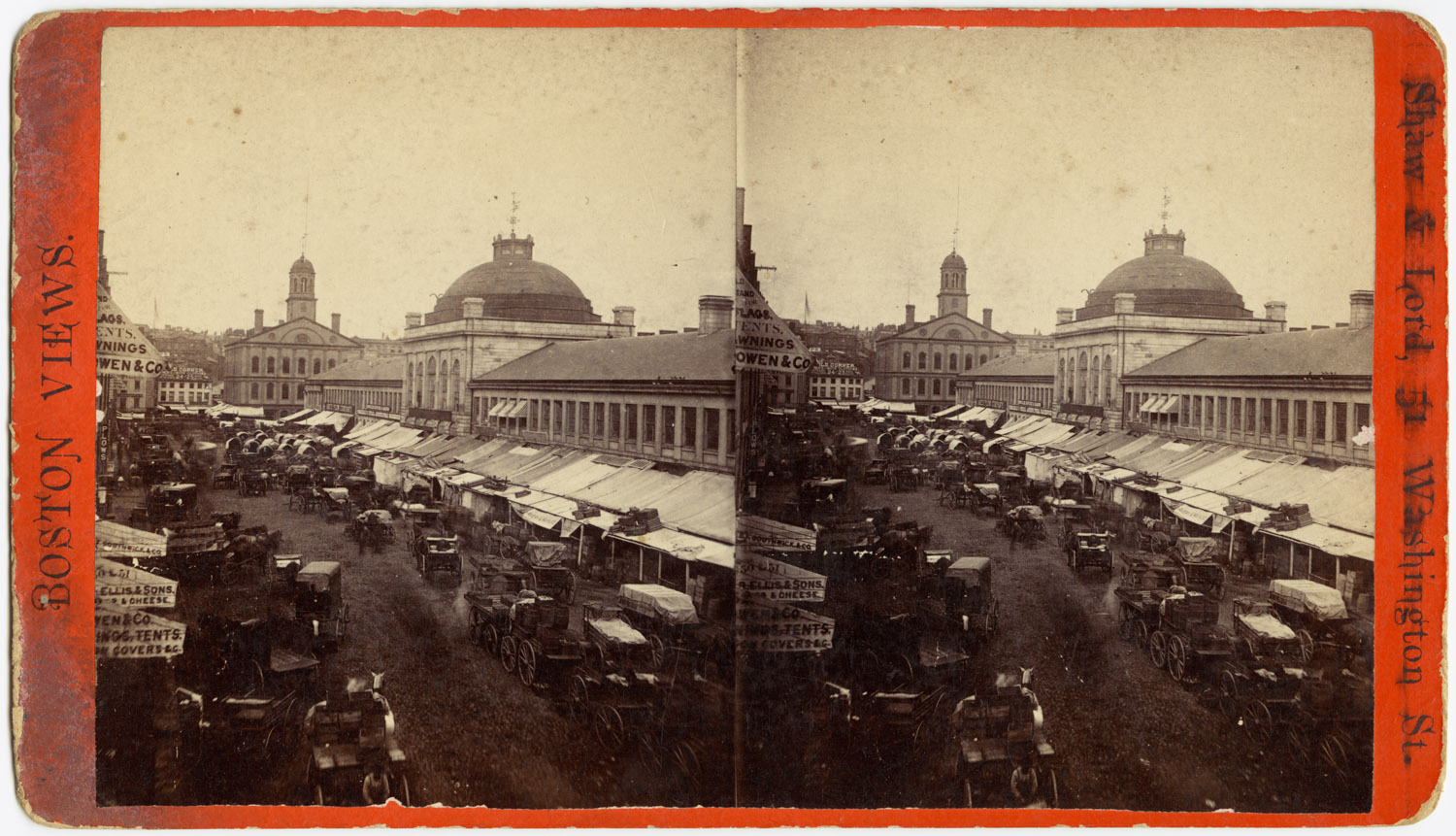
Quincy Market's central building in the 19th century

The individual units in the North and South Markets were gradually completed and occupied before the new marketplace's opening. The central building and streets were substantially completed by mid-1826. After Quincy objected to having the market named after him, the City Council named it Faneuil Hall Market while leaving the older building's name unchanged. Licenses for stalls in the central building were sold in July. Following delays caused by the need to repair the nearby Long Wharf, the complex formally opened on August 26, 1826. The first customer, Paul Wild of Quincy, Massachusetts, bought a leg of lamb. Work on the central building continued through November, after which the market committee was dissolved. The entire marketplace had cost $1,141,272, (Note: Equivalent to $38.43 million in 2025) of which the central building had cost $149,159. (Note: Equivalent to $5.02 million in 2025) About three-quarters of the total development cost was recouped via land sales, bringing the net expenditure to $384,205, over 20% below budget. (Note: Equivalent to $12.94 million in 2025) Most lenders had been compensated by the end of 1826, and the old Faneuil Hall's merchants had all relocated to the new marketplace by 1827.

The complex was commonly known as Quincy Market. Skeptical observers, believing that the market would never reach capacity, originally derided it as "Quincy's Folly", though the market quickly grew in popularity. The central building, which was nicknamed the Bull Market for the food sold inside, had a food market on its first floor. The second floor had exhibition space; the first exhibition there, sponsored by the New England Society for the Promotion of Manufactures and Mechanic Arts, took place in late 1826. The first floors of the North and South Markets had stores as well. The North and South Markets' upper stories had offices and storage, and the cellars were rented out or used by the units' owners.

The streets surrounding the market were renamed multiple times in the late 1820s and early 1830s, and some storefronts in the North and South Markets were already being resold and modified by then. The central building's second floor hosted events such as a 1829 showcase of Robert Salmon's paintings and, until 1832, biennial events of the New England Society. The Massachusetts Charitable Mechanic Association began hosting exhibitions on the central building's second floor in 1837, and a footbridge to Faneuil Hall was built, allowing events to be held across both buildings. The central building's rotunda and Faneuil Hall's meeting room were both known as the Great Hall, creating confusion, despite efforts to remedy the matter. The central building's eastern wing was used by the Ladies' Fair. Although the market lacked a direct freight-railroad connection, it was successful by 1840, and it gradually became the Boston government's only profitable business enterprise. The city government turned over the central building's operation in 1842 to a clerk, who decided which merchants could lease space there.

==== 1850s to 1890s ====
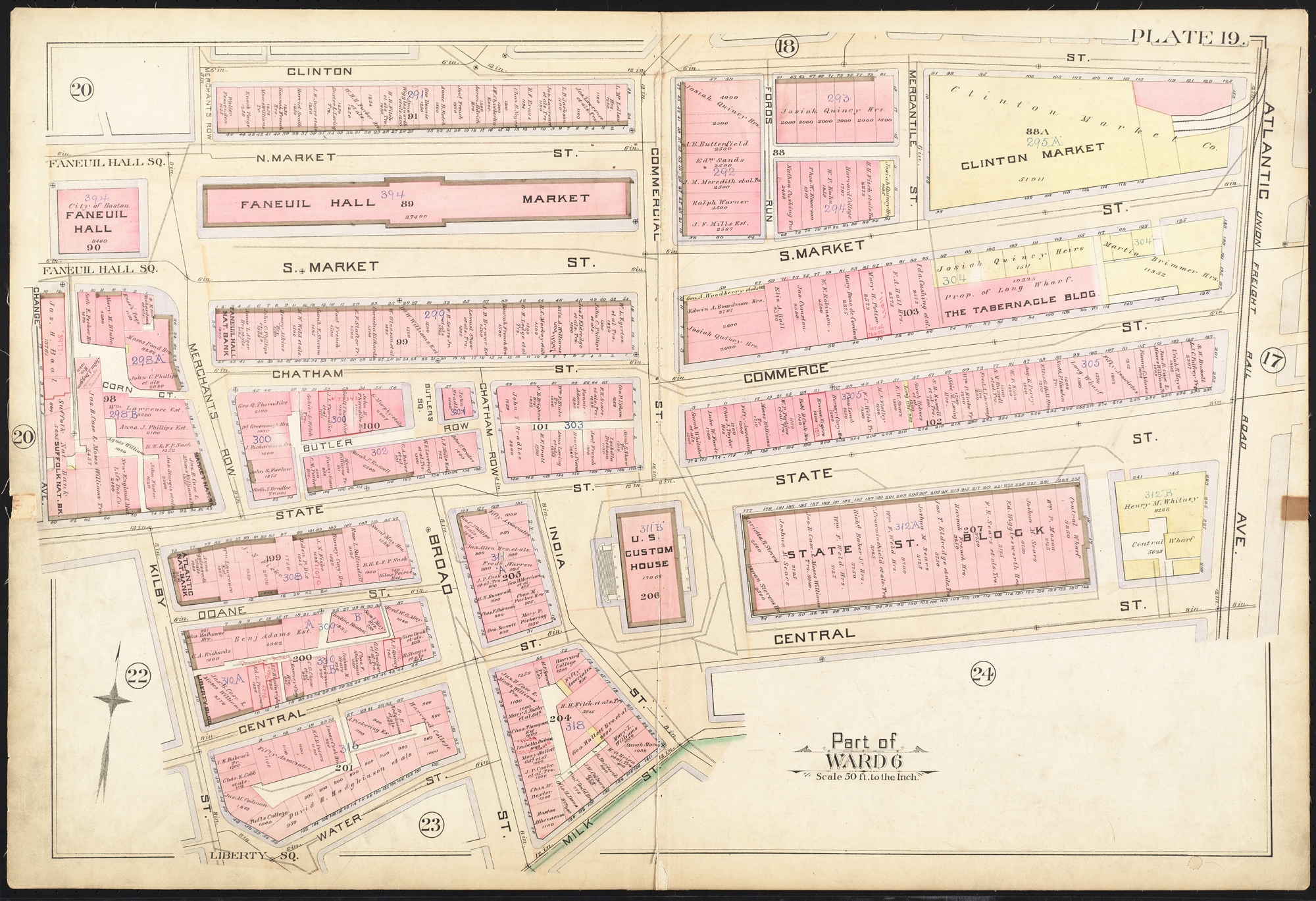
Map of the area in 1888, showing further development to the east. The central building (labeled "Faneuil Hall Market") and the North and South Markets are shown at top left.

In 1852, a superintendent began managing the central market, and the city considered leasing out stalls via auction, although the latter plan faced opposition and was shelved. The next year, some North and South Market merchants asked the city to relax the deed restrictions so they could expand their structures. The City Council voted in 1855 to allow dormers in the North and South Markets' roofs. To address overcrowding, the council also considered lengthening the central building and adding two stories that year, but these plans were canceled due to opposition. Instead, the old Faneuil Hall's original marketplace reopened in 1858, providing additional capacity. The city also rejected a private group's offer to purchase the central building.

During the late 19th and early 20th centuries, floors were added to the North and South Markets. More than half of the South Market units were expanded, while the North Market was less drastically modified. The central building's second floor was converted into commercial space by the 1860s, and an agricultural firm moved into the wings. That building was damaged by fire in 1862. By the late 1860s, the city collected $53,000 in rental income annually. (Note: Equivalent to $0.91 million in 2025) Although the complex survived the 1872 Boston fire, subsequent development tended to be farther inland (to the west), while the docks to the east were simultaneously being infilled via land reclamation.

The complex celebrated its 50th anniversary in 1876. One-third of the North Market units, and half of the South Market units, retained their original owners. After the central building's second floor hosted its last exhibition in 1877, the space was split into offices, and a mezzanine was built in the rotunda. The second-floor offices were occupied by such groups as the Boston Produce Exchange and the Boston Fruit Dealers Association. The Produce Exchange's successor, the Chamber of Commerce, partitioned the central building's rotunda into meeting rooms in 1885.

=== 20th century ===
==== 1900s to 1930s ====
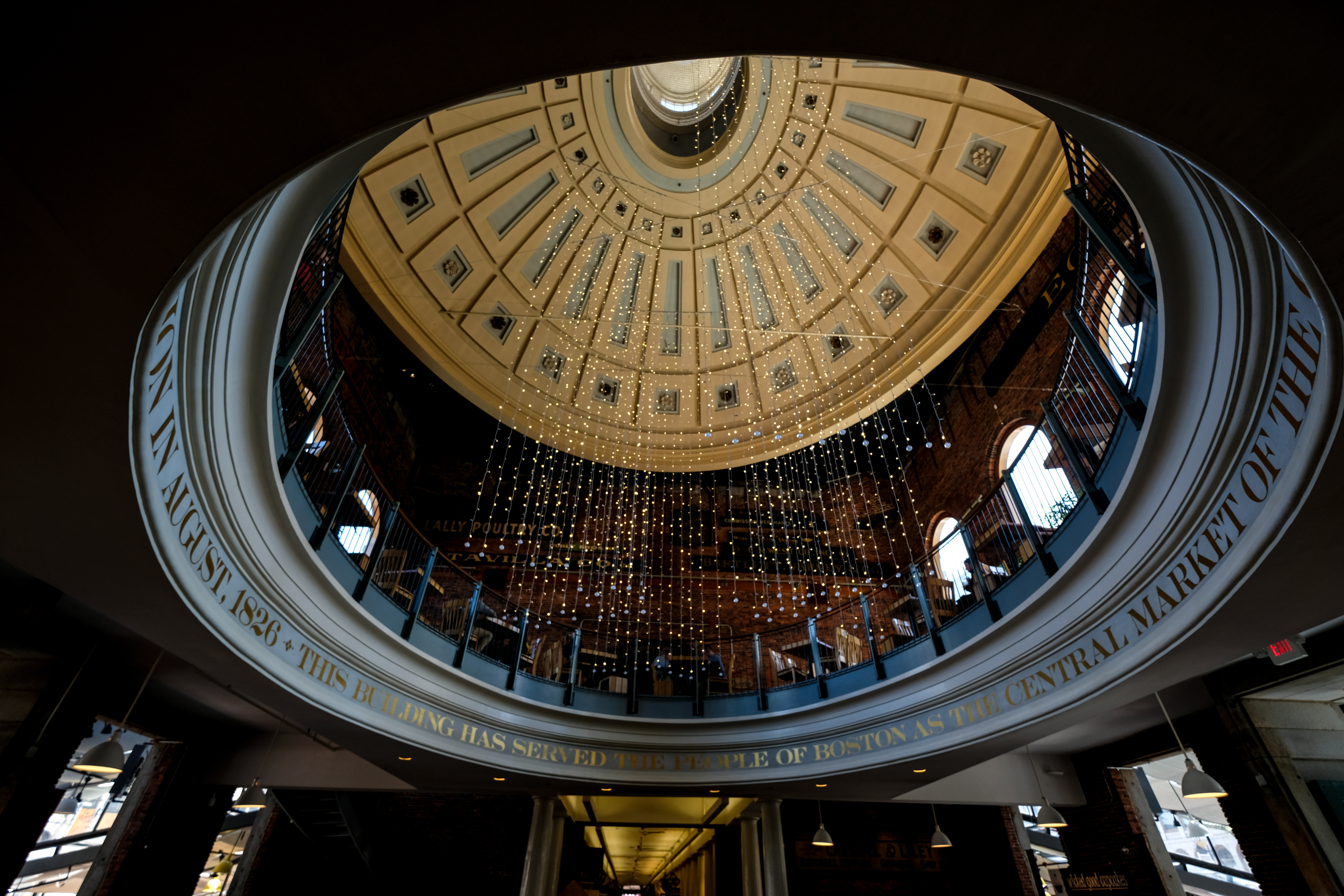
The central building's rotunda (seen here in 2018) became additional space for the Boston Fruit and Produce Exchange in the 1920s.

By the 1900s, the market faced competition from nearby marketplaces that operated longer hours. In 1902, Colonel F. F. Holbrook proposed extending Broad Street through the site; this would require demolishing parts of each building, which the merchants opposed. Holbrook then proposed relocating the market, but the city government rejected any modifications to the marketplace. The central building received electric lights and refrigerators c. 1910, and the floor of its first-story corridor was replaced. By that decade, the city earned at least $100,000 annually (Note: Equivalent to $2.41 million in 2025) from the central building. That building's second story was subdivided in 1913 and used by four tenants. Quincy Market as a whole had become a tourist attraction, and it was beginning to experience the same overcrowding and unsanitary conditions that had beset the previous market a century earlier.

In 1923, the complex's streets were converted to one-way traffic, and temporary stalls were built outside the North and South Markets while the original Faneuil Hall's market was renovated. The central building was damaged in a May 1925 fire. Afterward, the second floor was partitioned into offices; the roof was rebuilt, though some of its copper was sold off. The rotunda was converted into additional space for the Boston Fruit and Produce Exchange. The complex hosted a multi-day centennial celebration in September 1926.

Profits declined in the 1930s due to the Great Depression, reduced international trade, and the increasing tendency to deliver goods over land. All three buildings fell into disrepair, and the North and South Markets were partially abandoned. Some merchants in the streets were considering relocating, even as the city loosened restrictions on street vending. Two of the North Market structures were razed in 1933 when North Street was widened. In 1935, the city allocated $460,000 for the central building, which was renovated under a Public Works Administration project. The work involved fireproofing the interiors and installing a new rotunda ceiling. and temporary stalls were installed in South Market Street during that time. One of the South Market stores was destroyed by fire in 1938 and rebuilt. Merchants in the central building often sold leases to each other until the late 1930s, when the city government began more tightly regulating leases.

==== 1940s to mid-1960s ====
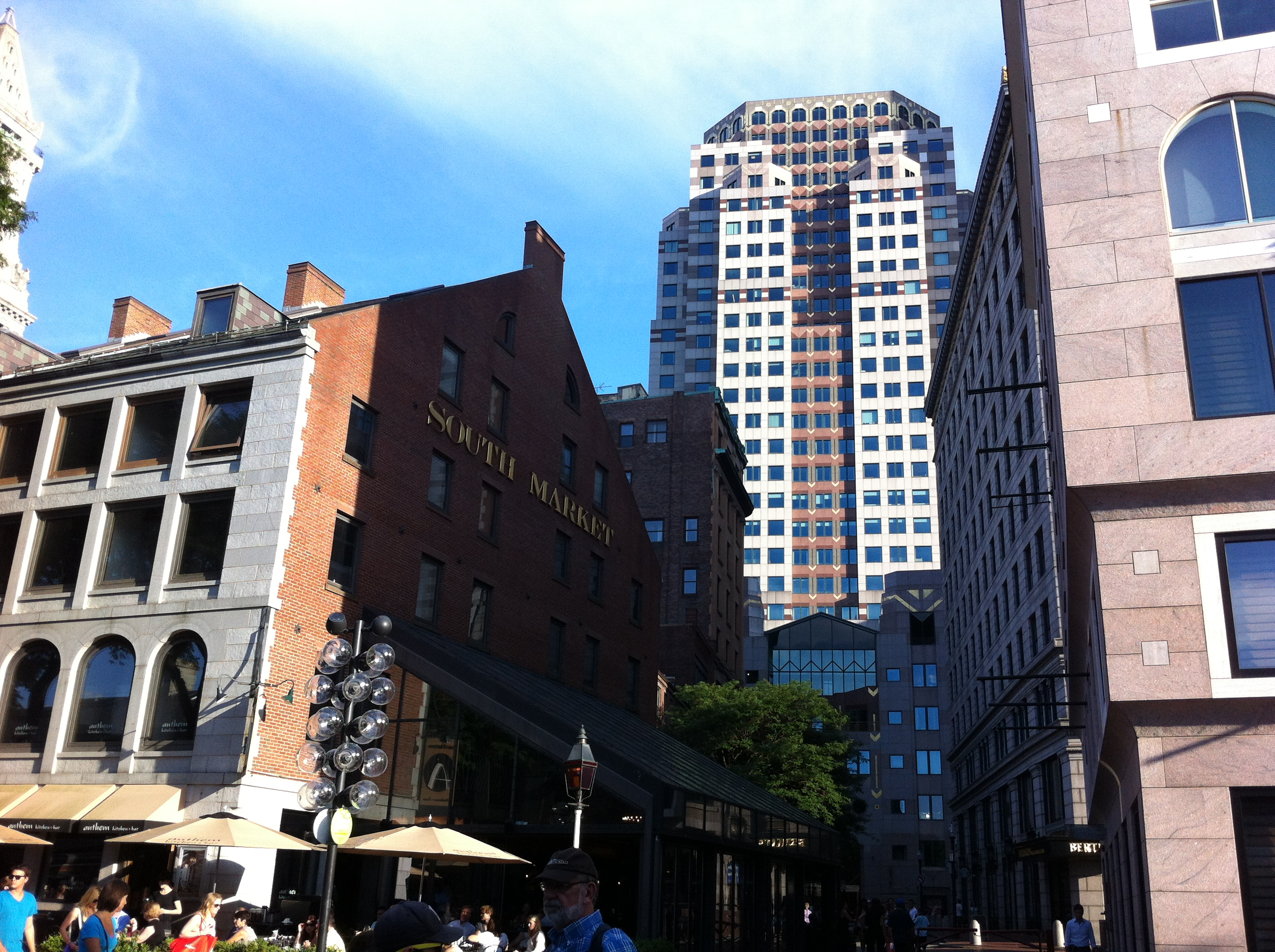
Southward view at the South Market's western end

The Quincy Market complex's financial decline continued in the 1940s, exacerbated by post-World War II white flight and the need to travel farther outside Boston for fresh produce. The outdated facilities could not handle growing vehicle traffic, and several roads and highways were being planned nearby. Large parts of the North and South Markets were vacant, while the central building was unsanitary and functionally outmoded. In 1946, a local committee asked the Boston government to consider demolishing the central building, replacing it with a park and widened streets, and constructing a garage underneath. State and federal authorities recommended relocating the Faneuil Hall and Quincy Market marketplaces in 1949, and the United States Department of Agriculture (USDA) endorsed a new central marketplace the next year. This became the South Boston Market Terminal, which opened in 1953.

When much of the area was razed in the early 1950s for the Central Artery highway, the complex escaped demolition. Even with the new terminal and highway, most vendors initially remained at Quincy Market because of its low rent, and the parking lots under the Central Artery reduced congestion. There were continued calls to relocate the market, and vendors variously suggested constructing a new facility to replace the North or South Markets. The highway eventually did cause many remaining vendors to disperse, since it cut the market off from the waterfront. The complex was physically in very poor shape, with rat infestations. The North and South Markets were nearly completely abandoned and were so badly neglected that some units were in various states of demolition. At the central building, cracks and dirt were prevalent, and the mechanical systems were outdated.

The Boston government wanted to demolish the buildings entirely, though no redevelopment plans had been publicly presented by the late 1950s. The city's planning board deemed the buildings unsuitable for alternate uses in 1956, but preservationists such as Walter Muir Whitehill advocated for their retention. At the behest of Mayor John Hynes, the planning board conducted a study, which suggested redeveloping the area. Workers repainted and repaired the central building in 1961, and a cleanup of the area began the next year. By the mid-1960s, the market's relocation was again being studied.

== Faneuil Hall Marketplace ==
Faneuil Hall Marketplace
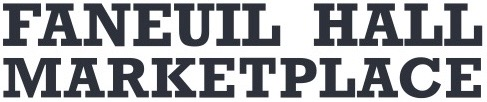

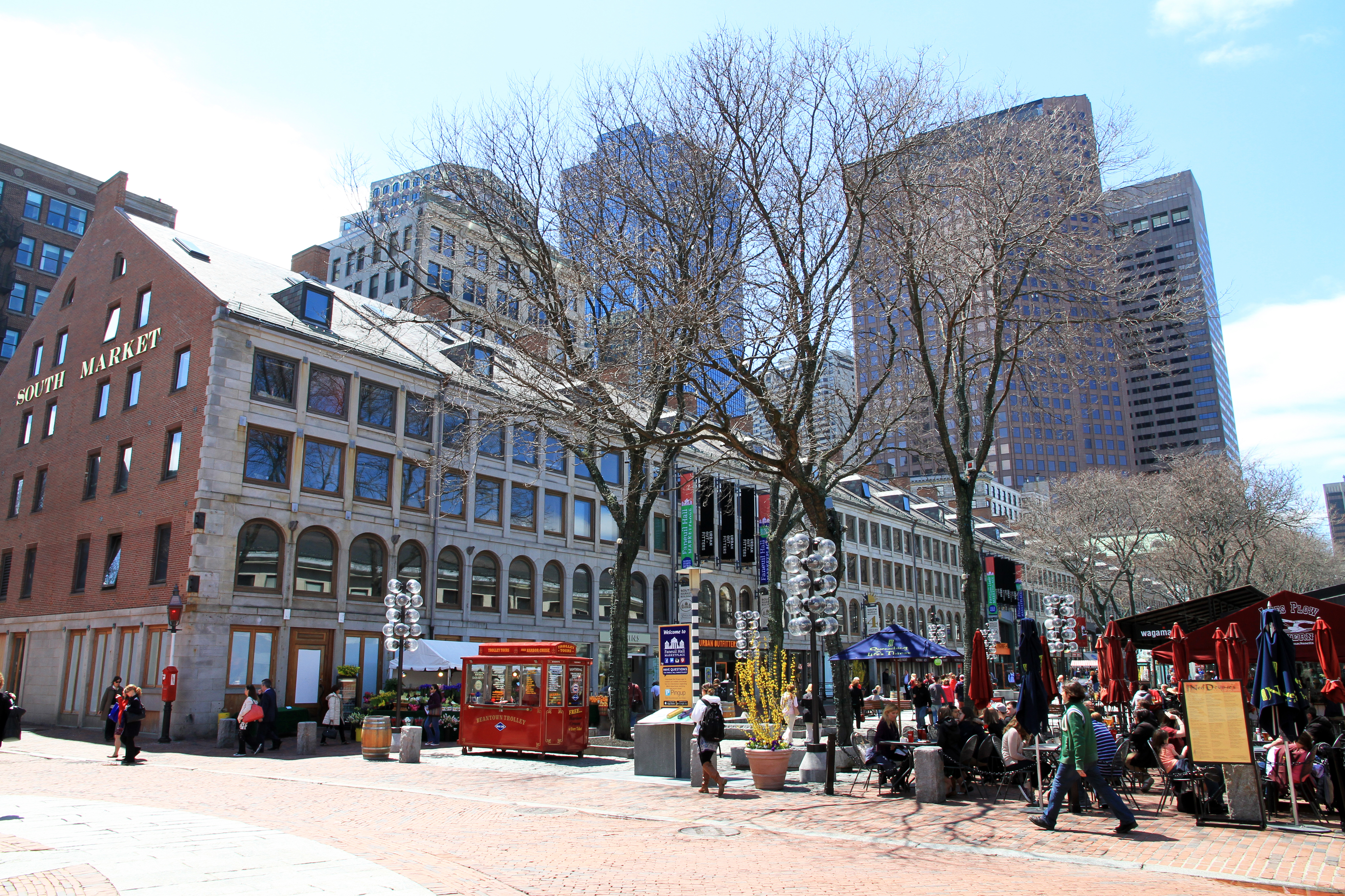
- South Market (2013)
- Location: Boston, Massachusetts, U.S.
- Address: 4 S. Market Street
- Opened: August 26, 1976; 50 years ago
- Developer: The Rouse Company
- Manager: J. Safra Real Estate
- Owner: City of Boston
- Architect: Benjamin Thompson & Associates, Inc.
- Num. of stores: 100+
- Parking: Nearby parking garages
- Website: faneuilhallmarketplace.com

Following initial efforts to preserve Quincy Market in the 1960s, it was renovated into the Faneuil Hall Marketplace in the 1970s. Developed by Rouse Company subsidiary Faneuil Hall Marketplace, Inc., it was the firm's first festival marketplace. The first part of the project, the central building, opened on August 26, 1976. The Boston Globe cites the marketplace as spanning the three Quincy Market buildings and Faneuil Hall, which are all owned by the Boston government; the city government operates Faneuil Hall directly, while the three Quincy Market buildings are privately operated.

=== Preservation and redevelopment ===
==== Initial efforts ====
Boston Redevelopment Authority (BRA) director Edward J. Logue was involved in early efforts to preserve Quincy Market. Logue was appointed by Mayor John F. Collins, who wished to redevelop Boston's waterfront. The Boston City Council authorized the city government to request federal funds for planning in 1962, and the BRA conducted a study of Quincy Market the next year, in which it recommended demolition. The agency subsequently decided to save the buildings after Logue found the complex's history and architecture interesting enough to merit further study. The development of Government Center nearby had revived interest in the area, and the neighborhood had some of Boston's few surviving 17th- and 18th-century streets and buildings. The City Council gave the BRA permission to acquire the North and South Market buildings in 1964, by which point the USDA wanted 273 remaining vendors to move to a more modern marketplace. None of the marketplace's original owners remained. The BRA subsequently obtained 42 of 45 units in the North and South Markets. The Durgin-Park restaurant, an existing tenant, retained three units, and the city owned the central building.

Preservationist Roger Webb and architect Frederick Stahl advocated for Quincy Market's restoration, preparing a report in conjunction with Webb's organization Architectural Heritage Foundation and the Society for the Preservation of New England Antiquities. The group suggested that the properties be leased to a single developer, who would operate the whole complex. Kevin White, who became Boston's mayor in 1968, endorsed the redevelopment, calling the existing market a congested "eyesore". After the Webb–Stahl study was completed, White announced plans that November to redevelop Quincy Market (excluding the Durgin-Park structures) as a shopping district with pedestrian plazas. He also approached the United States Department of Housing and Urban Development (HUD) for funding, requesting $2.1 million to restore the city's and BRA's structures. At the time, the buildings' interiors needed an estimated $9 million in renovations, and the marketplace was only 30% occupied.

HUD gave the city funds in 1969, and the city hired Stahl's architecture firm and Architectural Heritage as consultants for the redevelopment. Project manager Roger Lang, consulting architect James H. Ballou, and structural engineer William LeMessurier were also involved. After Webb and Stahl submitted their final plans, the city announced in May 1970 that the redevelopment would proceed, and the BRA solicited bids for a 6.5-acre (2.6 ha) area surrounding Quincy Market that October. A weekly flea market was organized there in April 1971. That June, BRA selected R. M. Bradley Co. and Van Arkle & Moss Inc. to redevelop the marketplace. The developers hired Benjamin Thompson to draw up plans, which called for a food market at ground level and specialty stores above. The George Macomber Co. was hired as the redevelopment's general contractor.

==== Rouse plans ====
Due to the original developers' failure to obtain funding, the BRA fired them in January 1972, and the agency solicited plans from other groups. After trying unsuccessfully to partner with another developer for three months, Thompson approached shopping center developer James W. Rouse of The Rouse Company. Rouse began petitioning the BRA for the development contract. He and Thompson proposed renovating the central building into a "food bazaar" and preserving the complex's various architectural styles. Rouse and Thompson believed their concept, filled mostly with small businesses, would economically revive central Boston. The Falzarano Construction Co. was hired that June to renovate the North and South Markets' facades, and they began work later that year. The project involved restoring these buildings' original roof heights by removing extra stories. Workers also patched the facade with granite, replaced the windows, rebuilt two of the South Market structures, replaced the roofs, and reinforced the interior beams. Meanwhile, Webb had made a competing bid, which was similar to Rouse's proposal, aside from how it was financed. City officials favored Webb's proposal but reviewed Rouse's plan anyway.

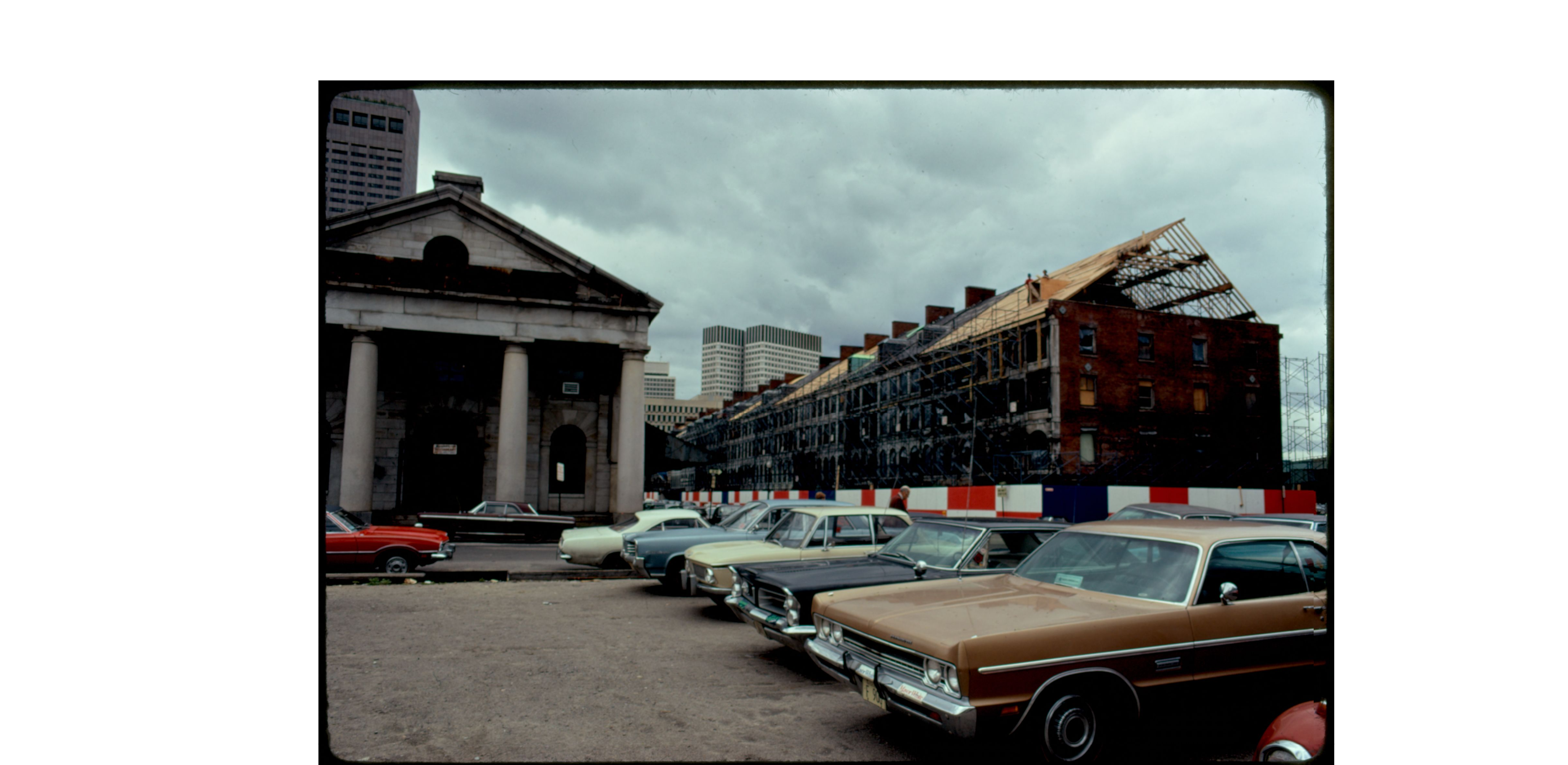
The complex, seen from the east during renovation (1973)

After the Rouse Company was selected as developer in March 1973, negotiations on the company's 99-year lease continued. The restoration of the first structures' interiors was completed in early 1974, though further renovations could not begin until full financing was secured. That May, the Rouse Company agreed to lease the complex, giving a portion of rental income to the city. Rouse obtained a $10.5 million construction loan from Chase Bank, which funded half the renovation's cost, along with $21 million in annuity financing from TIAA. Chase's loan required that Rouse obtain the remaining construction funds from local banks, but lenders were loath to provide funding without a large anchor tenant. Falzarano was fired in December after falling behind schedule; the HUD grant and an additional $300,000 in city bonds had been depleted, and the firm claimed that there were still significant structural defects. Rouse ultimately obtained financing from nearly a dozen local banks, (Note: One source gives a figure of exactly 12 banks.) led by the First National Bank of Boston. In exchange, he agreed to split the redevelopment project into three phases and lease 10,000 square feet (930 m^{2}) to the fast-food chain The Magic Pan. Splitting the phases allowed Rouse's team to concentrate their efforts on one building at a time.

Rouse's lease was finalized in February 1975, with the Macomber Co. remaining as general contractor. Work on the first phase, the central building's renovation, began that November; about 20 remaining vendors continued occupying half of that building as work proceeded in the other half. The development included adding storefronts to the central building and to the North and South Markets' lower stories, along with new glass pavilions beside the central building. The North and South Markets' upper stories were converted to offices. Thompson redecorated the streets, changed the windows, and modified the central building's dome. The BRA hired a contractor to repair the roofs in September, and over two-thirds of the space had been leased by the next month. Carlyle Real Estate Limited Partnership became a co-developer in December, giving $3.2 million for the project. Amid difficulties renovating the central building, Rouse convinced the city to reduce his lease payments. The marketplace hired its first general manager in May 1976, and work on the second phase, the South Market, began that July.

=== 1976–1989: Opening and early years ===
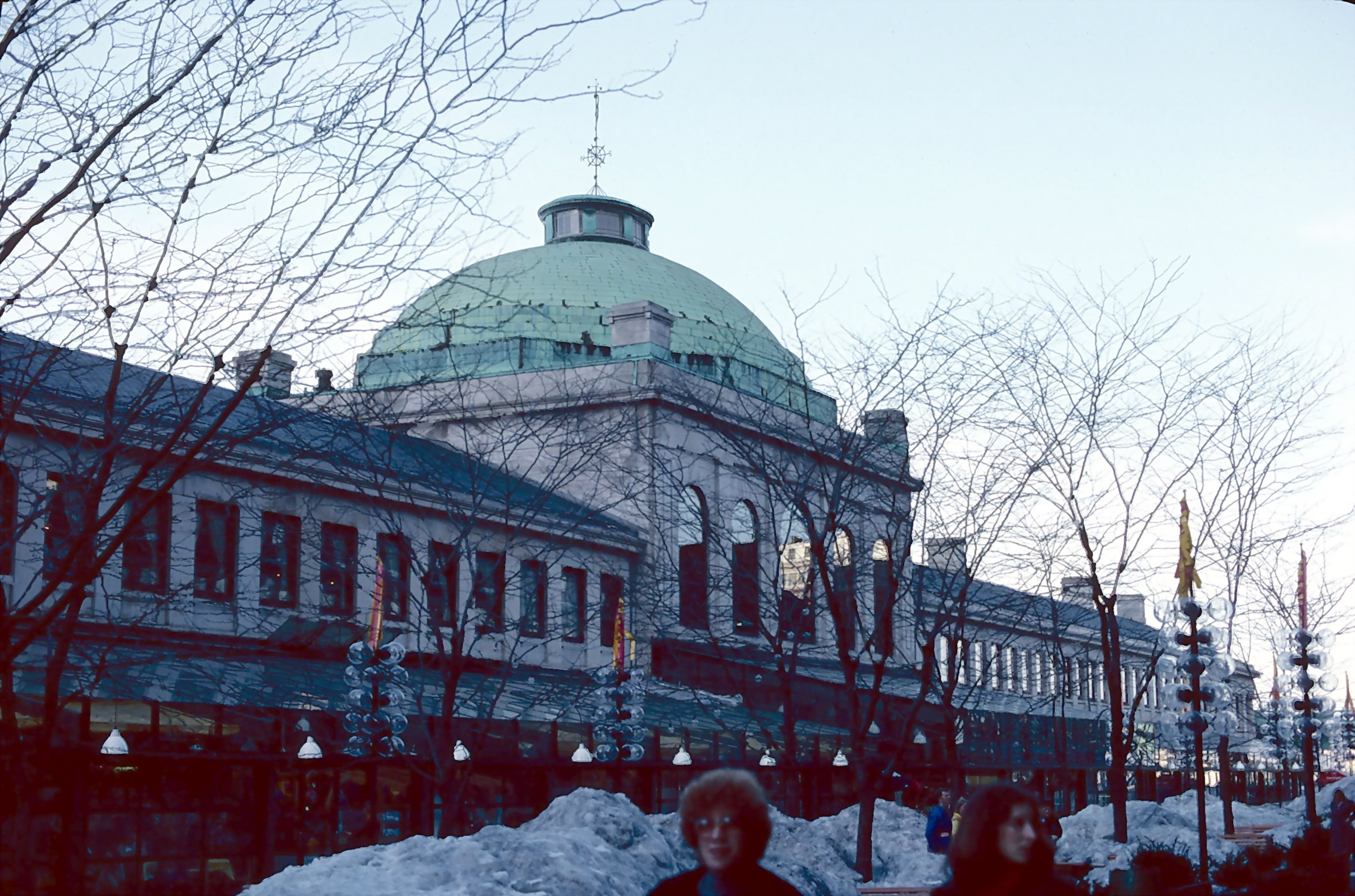
Quincy Market's central building (1978)

The three buildings opened on August 26 of consecutive years, coinciding with the date of the original market's opening. The central building opened on Quincy Market's 150th anniversary, August 26, 1976, with much fanfare. In addition to shops, it hosted a United States Bicentennial exhibit. Within a year, the central building was attracting 30,000 daily visitors and had earned $22 million. The management team had tight control over retailers' leases, and the complex had its own security team and garbage disposal plant. The building was fully occupied by late 1976, and the marketplace regularly saw large crowds, particularly at midday. Two-thirds of the initial visitors were from Greater Boston. The second phase, the South Market, opened in 1977. The final phase of the development was the North Market, which opened in 1978.

The redevelopment project helped boost Boston's economy, even amid declines in the city's population and skepticism that the project would succeed without a large anchor tenant. The project prompted residential and hotel developments nearby, and it spurred increases in parking-garage and MBTA public transit revenue. Faneuil Hall Marketplace was attracting 35–45 thousand daily visitors by the late 1970s, drawing visitors away from the nearby North End neighborhood. Sales per square foot were 1.5 to 2 times higher than in comparable shopping malls, with the complex earning $40 million or $50 million annually. The complex attracted over 14 million annual visitors by its fifth anniversary, more than Walt Disney World. During the mid-1980s, the complex had over 150 businesses and nearly two dozen restaurants, and up to 800 people worked in its offices. Over the marketplace's first two decades, the Rouse Company paid the city an average of $2 million in annual real-estate taxes. Although financially successful, the marketplace became known as a tourist trap.

An expansion east of Faneuil Hall Marketplace was proposed in 1981 and approved by the BRA two years later. Known as Marketplace Center, the expansion was completed by 1986; the section of Commercial Street separating Quincy Market and Marketplace Center was closed and pedestrianized. Another structure west of the South Market was also constructed during that decade. Several merchants formed the Faneuil Hall Merchants Association, which sued the Rouse Company in the early 1980s over what they claimed were excessive maintenance fees; the lawsuit was resolved with a $3 million settlement. Annual revenue peaked at $100 million in 1988. That year, Rouse sought permission for repairs, including new canopies, lamps, drainage systems, and an information booth; these would cost at least $5 million. The project began in 1989 and included new stairs and other modifications in the central building. At the time, the city had to approve all changes to the buildings and streets, but amid a decline in the number of small businesses, it had no control over tenant selection.

=== 1990s–2000s: Decline ===
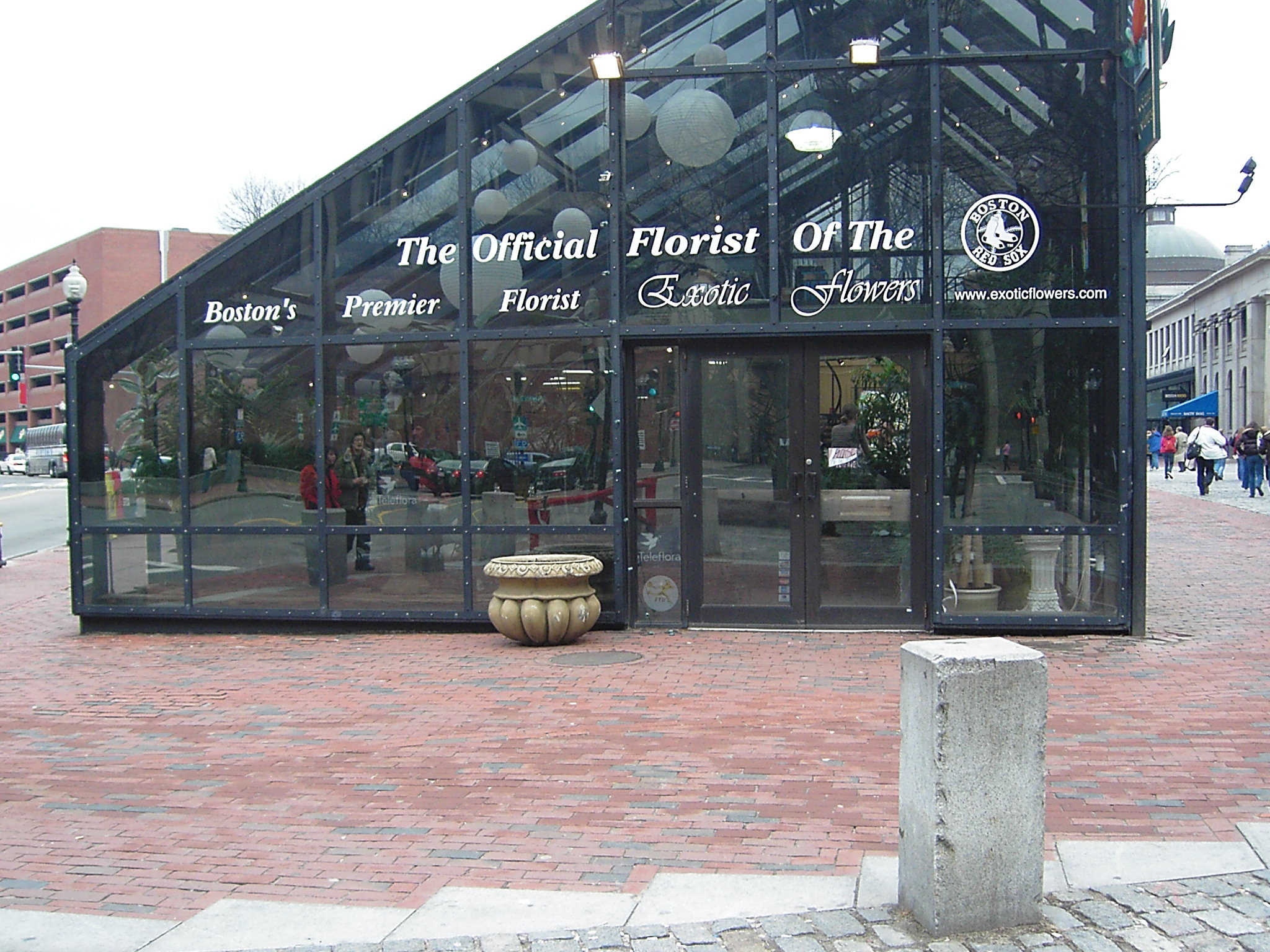
A glass pavilion in the redeveloped marketplace (2008)

During the 1990s, business declined because of the nearby Big Dig highway construction project, the opening of upscale restaurants elsewhere in Boston, and the early 1990s recession. The Rouse Company increased tenants' rental fees during the 1990s for no disclosed reason, though the firm was planning a multimillion-dollar renovation of the complex. Tenants sued the Rouse Company in 1995 following long-running disputes over the fees. The suit was settled in 1997, at which point the marketplace earned $85 million annually. The lawsuit settlement, which required the Rouse Company to prioritize leasing to local shopkeepers, allowed the renovation to proceed. Officials began renovating the complex in 1999, making restroom and accessibility improvements, a climate-control system, and new restaurants at the central building's corners. The central building's dome was also refurbished, and the project was completed in 2001, just as the September 11 attacks caused steep declines in tourism.

General Growth Properties (GGP) obtained the lease for the marketplace in November 2004 after acquiring the Rouse Company for $12.6 billion. The city audited the marketplace's leases in 2006 following declines in occupancy, and a renovation was planned during that time. Amid financial issues stemming from the 2008 financial crisis, GGP placed the market for sale in 2008 and filed for bankruptcy, leading to a years-long dispute over maintenance and fees. GGP told the city in 2009 that it wished to keep the lease, following a lack of suitable purchase offers. Local merchants made their own bid for the property, and GGP began evicting tenants with overdue rent.

=== 2010s–present: New owners and additional changes ===
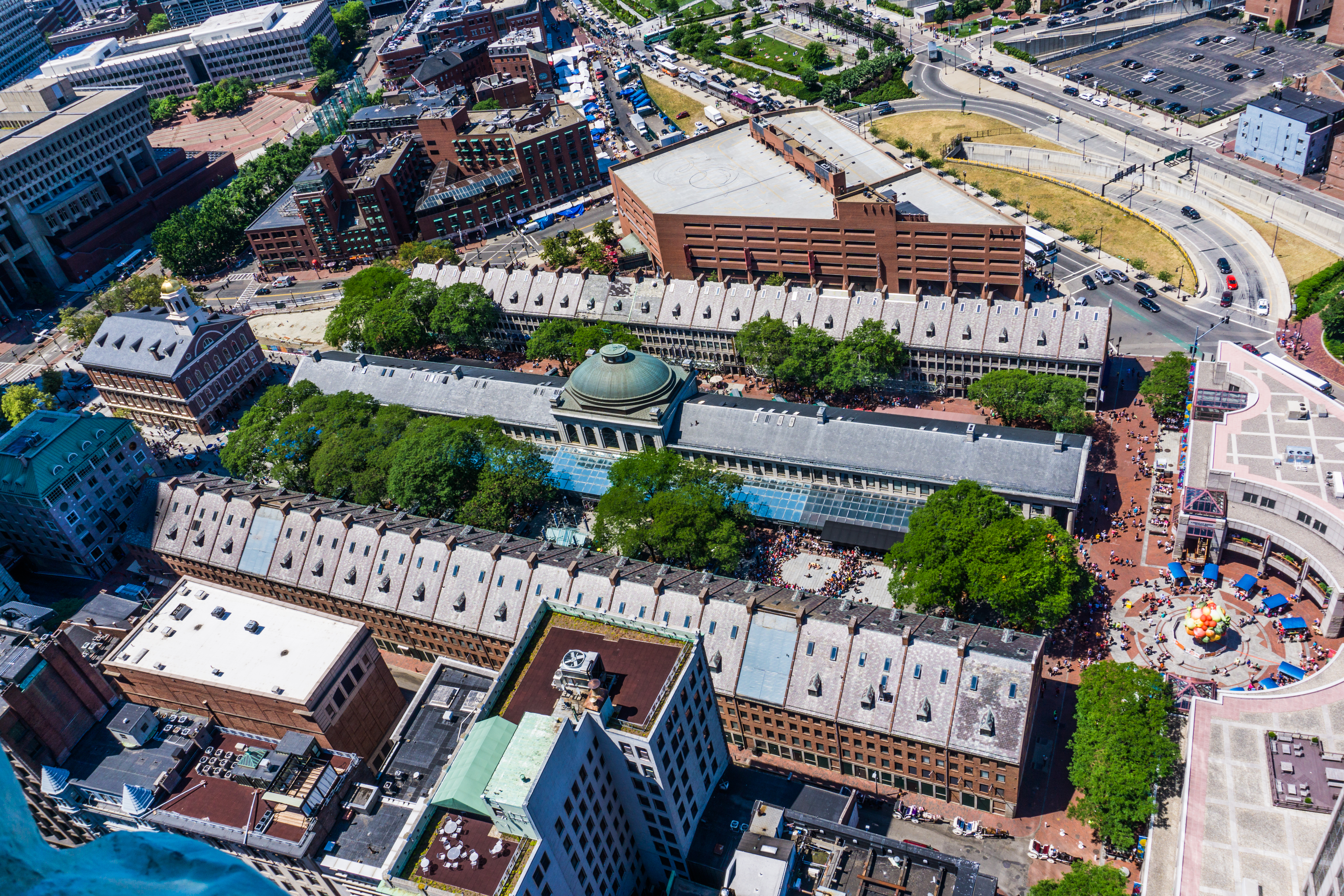
Quincy Market (center) and Faneuil Hall (left), viewed from the observation deck of the nearby Custom House Tower in 2016

In May 2011, GGP announced that it would sell its lease on Quincy Market to Ashkenazy Acquisition Corporation. Ashkenazy paid nominal rent of $10 annually, in addition to payments in lieu of taxes. After the BRA approved the sale that September, Ashkenazy finalized its takeover the next month for about $140 million. By then, patronage was declining, and Ashkenazy wished to add a hotel to the South Market and entice more businesses to the central building. It prepared a master plan for the marketplace, which was announced in September 2014. The plans included demolishing existing glass kiosks, rearranging the central building's interior, and adding a hotel. The food vendors in the central building's rotunda would be replaced with larger restaurants and bars, and elevators and stairs were to be installed there. Local merchants expressed concerns that Ashkenazy was planning to eventually evict tenants, since expired long-term leases were being replaced by month-to-month leases.

Clothing brand Uniqlo opened a flagship store in the complex in October 2015. That year, Ashkenazy proposed significantly increasing fees for street performers at the complex, eliciting objections. Ashkenazy hired a broker to advertise the complex to local merchants. Elkus Manfredi Architects designed a glass pavilion for Sephora adjoining the existing buildings, which opened in February 2017. The firm also drew up more plans for enclosed outdoor seating areas. Due to the COVID-19 pandemic, Faneuil Hall Marketplace was temporarily closed between March and June 2020. Despite city requests, Ashkenazy declined to defer tenants' rent payments or install outdoor restaurant seating to comply with social distancing restrictions. Ashkenazy fell behind on its own lease, which was threatened with eviction in November 2020, after which it paid $2.1 million in back taxes.

Ashkenazy sold the marketplace to J. Safra Real Estate, one of its financiers, in February 2024; by then, the complex needed an estimated $45 million worth of repairs. Although there were discussions of a potential renovation, nothing had occurred by early 2026. Visitation had decreased 30% from pre-pandemic levels, and Mayor Michelle Wu was advocating for the renovation. Small business owners expressed concerns that they were not consulted by the mayor's office. That August, J. Safra filed seven suits against tenants regarding $2 million in unpaid rent; some of these lawsuits were later dismissed.

== Architecture ==
Alexander Parris designed all three Quincy Market buildings. The central building, a two-story granite structure, was the most ornate. It is flanked by the North and South Markets, a pair of 4 1/2-story brick and granite buildings (Note: The North and South Markets are also described as four stories high with an attic. The Boston Landmarks Commission describes the South Market as four stories high with two attics; the same agency describes the North Market as four and a half stories high in another report.) designed in a more utilitarian style. The three buildings contain a combined 290,000 square feet (27,000 m^{2}) of retail space and 140,000 square feet (13,000 m^{2}) of office space. The structures are built on pyramidal foundations, distributing the buildings' weight across the underlying clay.

=== Central building ===
The central building (also called Quincy Market) is designed in the Greek Revival style, which Parris had previously used for the Somerset Club building and St. Paul's Church in Boston. It rises two stories and consists of three parts, laid out west–east in a roughly 535-by-50-foot (163 by 15 m) rectangle. The north and south elevations of the facade are divided vertically into 59 bays. The outer wings measure 173 by 50 feet (53 by 15 m) each. They have gable roofs, which are made of slate with copper gutters. The middle section is the most elaborate part of the building, with a domed rotunda; it measures 74.5 by 55 feet (22.7 by 16.8 m) across, (Note: Quincy 2003, p. 93, gives a slightly different measurement of 74 by 55 feet (23 by 17 m).) protruding from the outer wings' northern and southern facades.

==== Exterior ====
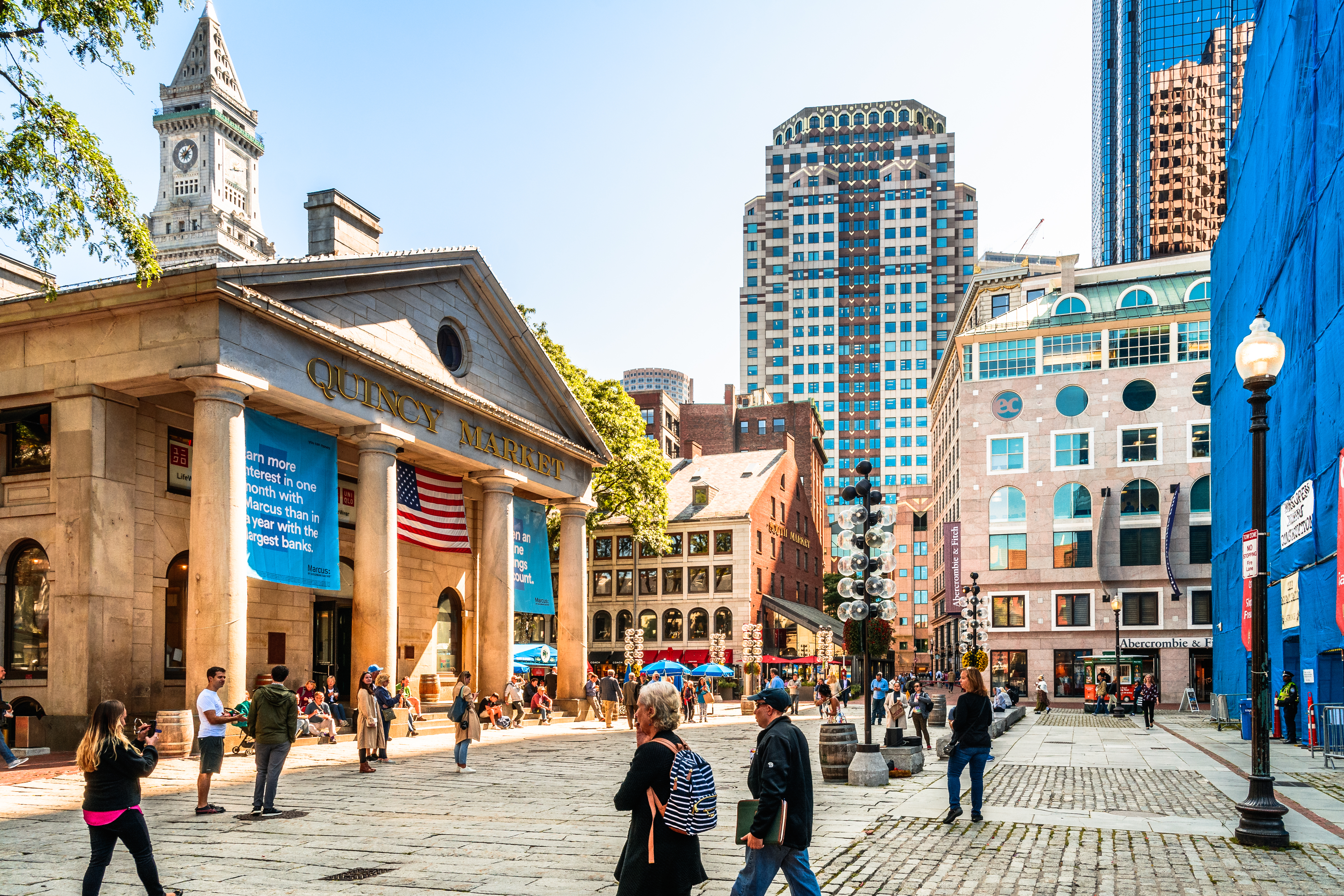
The portico at the west end of the central building

The central building uses granite from Quincy, Massachusetts, only in the lowest 2 5/6 feet (0.86 m) of the facade, since there was a shortage of Quincy granite at the time of construction. The material used in the rest of the facade came from various parts of New England. (Note: Specifically, several sources describe the granite as having been sourced from Chelmsford, Massachusetts; Concord, New Hampshire; and Hallowell, Maine.) The building has a raised basement, illuminated by small window openings. The first and second stories have sash windows, which are 14 feet (4.3 m) tall on the first story and 14.5 feet (4.4 m) tall on the second. The first floor is 3 feet (0.91 m) above ground and has round arched windows. The second-story windows are square-headed. There are band courses running horizontally across the wings' facades, in addition to recessed spandrel panels separating the first- and second-story windows. The wings are topped by cornices 31 feet (9.4 m) high, which are made of Hallowell granite. Glass-and-metal canopies, dating from the 1970s, protrude from the north and south elevations. The canopies, covering three-quarters of the building's length, have movable glass panels for ventilation.

The western and eastern ends of the outer wings have porticoes (columned porches), inspired by the design of Athens's Parthenon, which are 11 5/8 feet (3.5 m) deep. The porticoes at either end are composed of four Doric columns, each weighing 15 short tons (13 long tons; 14 t). The columns were quarried from boulders found in Westford. Each column was cut as a single piece measuring 20 3/4 feet (6.3 m) high, (Note: Boston Landmarks Commission 1996, p. 5, cites a different height of 21 feet (6.4 m).) tapering in width from 42 to 33 inches (1,070 to 840 mm) between bottom and top. Above the columns is a pediment with a circular window, which was originally intended to ventilate the attic. The name "Quincy Market" is printed onto each pediment's frieze in gilded letters. Short staircases in these porticoes, and in the middle section, ascend to the first story.

The north and south elevations of the middle section are divided into five segmental arches on the first story and five round arches on the second story. The first story of the middle section has a facade of rusticated blocks, and the second-story windows are separated vertically by column-like pilasters. The middle section's roof is a saucer dome, inspired by Pantheon in Rome and the Massachusetts General Hospital. This dome, resting on an octagonal drum, measures 70 by 50 feet (21 by 15 m) across and is surrounded by a rooftop parapet. It is coated in copper and topped by a lantern. The dome, combined with the porticoes and raised basement, gave the impression of a Roman temple. Flues protruded from each corner of the roof.

==== Interior ====
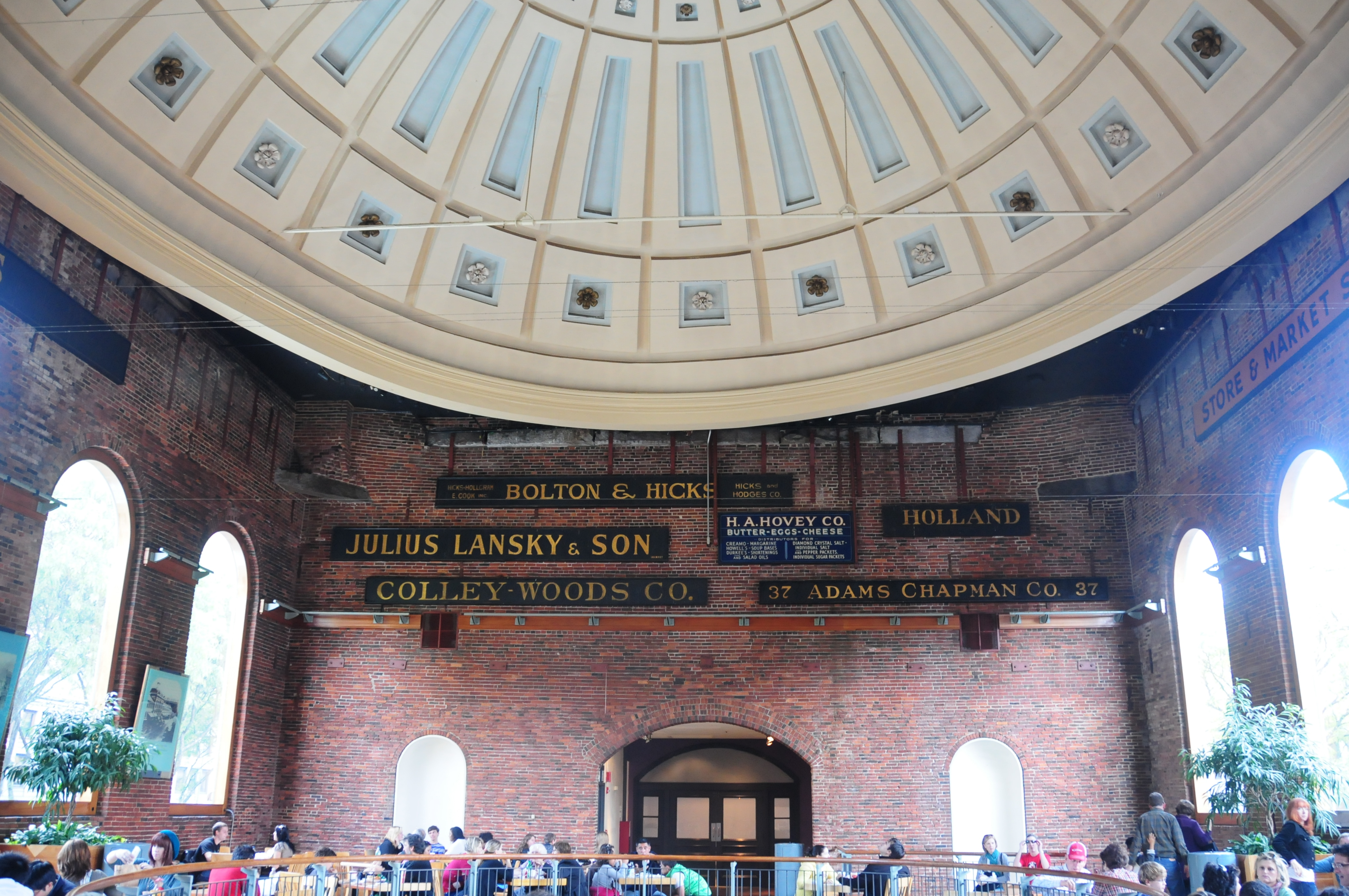
Dome in the Central Market building, 2010. This serves as the seating area for the food court now. The sign boards of old businesses decorate the walls

As built, the structure spanned 54,000 square feet (5,000 m^{2}). The basement space was accessed from steep exterior staircases and was rented to merchants. Market activities were centered on the first floor, where vendors' stalls were recessed from columns flanking a central corridor. At the midpoint of the first floor (now the rotunda's lower level), vendors with large stalls originally worked. The wings' second stories had meeting areas, which were left unfinished and were separated by brick partitions. (Note: Sources disagree on whether each wing had two or three halls. The whereabouts of the original drawings are not known, but one of Parris's former draftsmen distributed modified drawings in 1841, showing the building with three halls in each wing. Another source from 1900 cites each wing as having two halls.) These meeting areas had been converted to offices by the late 20th century. Following the 1970s renovation, the building was divided into various storefronts and a common area, served by separate heating, ventilation, and air conditioning (HVAC) systems.

The first story's central 512-foot-long (156 m) corridor, which connects the west and east porticos, is 12 feet (3.7 m) wide and 14 feet (4.3 m) tall, The coved ceiling rests on entablatures flanking the corridor, which function as trusses supporting the second floor. The entablatures are supported by 118 or 120 Doric columns arranged in two parallel array. Forty-eight of these are "compression columns" with cast iron cores and wooden casings, while the other columns have tie rods connected to trusses beneath the second and first stories, supporting the first-story corridor like a bridge. The corridor's floor, supported by joists, it was originally made of brick but was replaced with oak in 1910. The rest of the floor is made of glazed and granite tiles. Several transverse corridors connect the north and south elevations, and there are wood-paneled doors at some entrances. The south wall of the main corridor also has stairs to the second floor.

At the center of the second floor is a rotunda commonly known as Quincy Hall; this was never the formal name, since the rotunda was officially called the Great Hall. There are windows on the north and south sides. To the west and east are brick walls, each with two empty niches flanking a passageway to the side wings. An oval hole was cut into the second floor during the 1970s renovation, overlooking the first-floor pavilion. The northwest and northeast corners have stairs connecting the two levels, and a balustrade surrounds the hole. The ceiling itself has coffers and rosettes, with a 14-by-12-foot (4.3 by 3.7 m) elliptical skylight at its peak. Made of plaster, it is suspended from the exterior dome and rises 46 feet (14 m) above the second floor.

=== North and South Markets ===
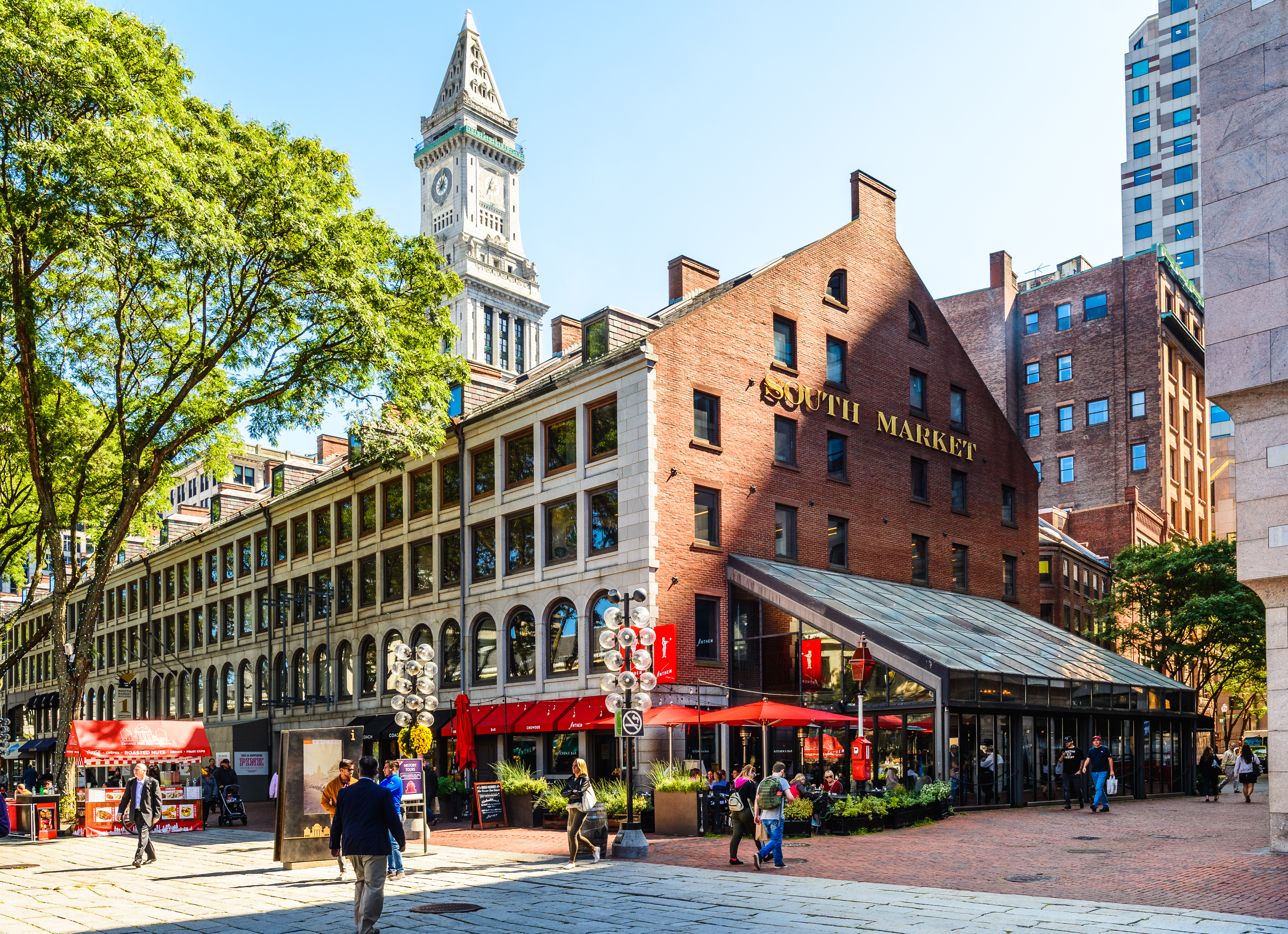
The South Market

The North and South Markets are internally divided into distinct units by brick party walls, which protrude from the roof and are capped by terracotta. Both market buildings contain a combined 45 units. The freestanding Hammond and Faxon stores, formerly west of the North Market, were demolished in 1933. The brick-and-granite facades of each unit are nearly identical. Compared with the other units, the center units in each building have additional vertical bays, while the bays in the outer units are generally wider. The midpoints of the North and South Markets both have narrow, open-air passageways connecting with adjacent streets. Interior passageways connect the shops on the lower stories of each building, while the upper stories have offices. The attics house HVAC equipment and were initially used as lofts.

In both buildings, the western and eastern elevations are faced in brick; the western elevation also has a protruding single-story glass-like enclosure. The use of a trabeated structural system permitted the use of larger windows and less masonry. Each unit has its own door, and there are outdoor staircases and ramps leading to stores in the basements. The front elevations have round-arched window openings on the second story and square-headed openings on the third and fourth stories. The windows have been heavily modified over the years. The brick portions of the facades have square-headed windows with sandstone windowsills below and flared lintels above, along with star-shaped faceplates. The cornices consist of granite at the front and brick dentils on the other elevations. The slate roofs are pitched, with protruding dormers, brick chimneys, gutters, and downspouts. Both buildings' roofs have skylights.

==== North Market ====
The North Market is oriented west–east and measures 520 by 55 feet (158 by 17 m) across. It contains 23 storefront units, which are all four bays wide at the front and three at the rear, except one of the central units, which spans five bays at the front and four at the rear. Each of the individual units is 20.5–25 feet (6–8 m) wide and 50 23/24–57 feet (16–17 m) deep. The front elevation and the side elevations' first stories are clad in Chelmsford granite, while the remainders of the facades are brick. The west and east elevations are four bays wide.

The granite portions of the facade have post and lintel-style openings. The first-floor storefronts are on the front and side elevations; they generally retain their original posts and lintels, although many storefronts have since been redecorated. The wider central unit has a vaulted open-air passageway connecting the front with Clinton Street in the rear. Three other units have passageways leading from front to rear, which contain entrances to the upper stories. In the three units once owned by Durgin-Park, there are garage doors, fire escapes, ventilation grates, and a rooftop sign. The Hammond and Faxon sites, west of Merchants Row, had similar designs to the extant structures, except that they were divided into eight bays and had hip roofs. A short passageway, Conduit Alley, separated the Hammond and Faxon sites.

==== South Market ====
The South Market is oriented west–east and measures 530 by 65 feet (162 by 20 m) across. It contains 22 storefront units, which are all four bays wide at the front and rear, except one of the central units, which is five bays wide. Each of the individual units is 22.5–28 feet (7–9 m) wide and 65 feet (20 m) deep. The front elevation and the other elevations' first stories are clad in Chelmsford granite, while the remainders of the facades are brick. The west and east elevations are four bays wide.

The granite portions of the facade have post and lintel-style openings. The first-floor storefronts on each elevation generally retain their original decorations, which include granite blocks, panels, and posts and lintels. Many storefronts have been redecorated, including two storefronts with double-height arches and another two with entrances to the basement. The wider central unit has a vaulted open-air passageway connecting the front with Chatham Street in the rear. Three other units have passageways leading from front to rear, which contain entrances to the upper stories.

== Name ==
The entire complex is colloquially known as Quincy Market. Originally, the complex was formally known as the Faneuil Hall Market; there is debate over how the name "Faneuil" is pronounced. The complex was also called the Faneuil Hall Markets, or just "the markets" or "the marketplace". The commonly used "Quincy Market" moniker was sometimes described in the 20th century as a misnomer, and there have been several unsuccessful attempts to make it the official name. The "Quincy Market" name can also refer just to the central market building, which has signage with this name.

Over the years, the name "Faneuil Hall Market" has been used in reference to both the old Faneuil Hall's market and Quincy Market, either individually or as a group. (Note: The term "Faneuil Hall Market" could be used to refer to solely Quincy Market (for which this was the official name), or solely the original Faneuil Hall Market (which was officially the "New Faneuil Hall Market"). Quincy Market's superintendent wrote in 1909 that the city-controlled marketplace, known as "Faneuil Hall Market", occupied both Faneuil Hall and the central Quincy Market building.) The older building's market was known as the New Faneuil Hall Market after 1858, despite Quincy Market being newer. Confusion persisted after the Faneuil Hall Marketplace redevelopment was completed. Quincy Market and the original Faneuil Hall became collectively known as the Faneuil Hall Marketplace, but some visitors incorrectly regarded Quincy Market and the Faneuil Hall Marketplace as separate entities. The term "Faneuil Hall" is also sometimes used for the three Quincy Market buildings only, or for all four buildings, and some visitors have associated the name "Faneuil Hall" exclusively with Quincy Market. One 1903 source wrote that visitors looking for Faneuil Hall often ended up in Quincy Market. The general area covering Quincy Market and surrounding buildings is sometimes known as the Market District.

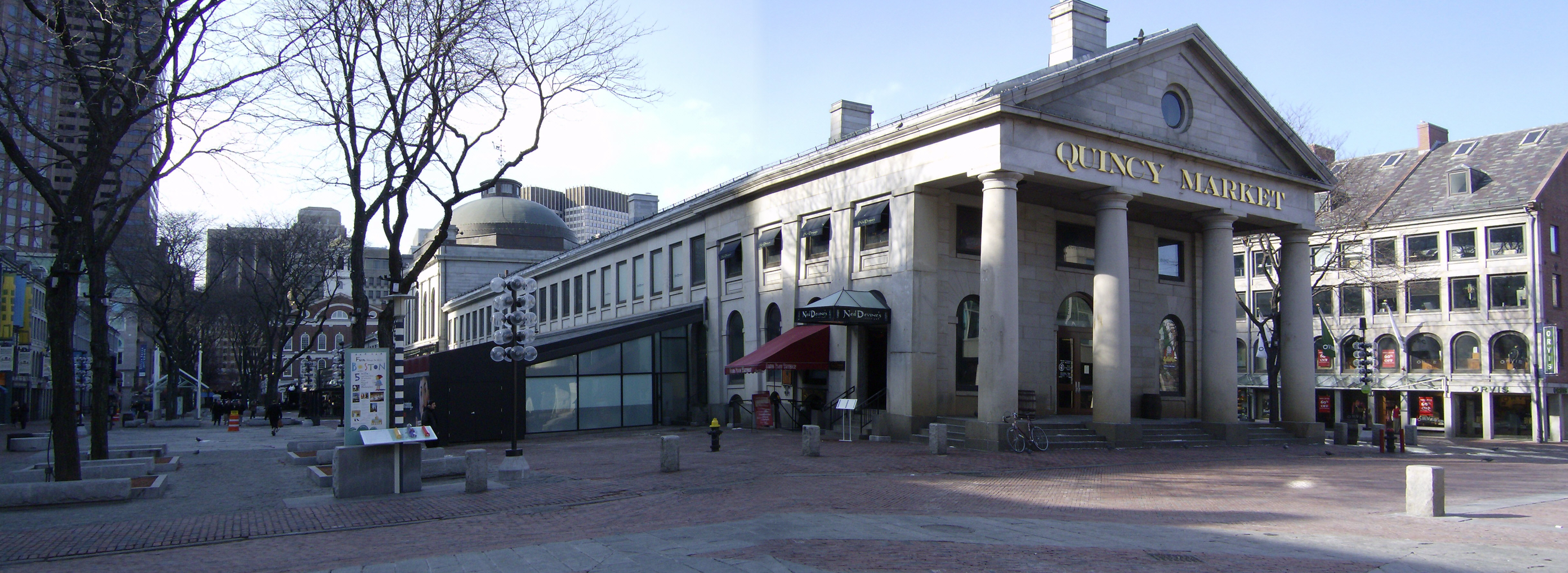
Panoramic view of Quincy Market (January 2007)

== Tenant composition ==
=== Original marketplace (1826–1976) ===
Originally, the central building's main floor had a food market with 128 stalls, of which 80 were reserved for meat, 4 for dairy, 19 for vegetables, and 20 for fish. The city kept rental rates low to attract tenants, and it allowed everything except "unwholesome articles" to be sold there. There was a bell, which was rung at opening and closing before the market was outfitted with electricity. The North and South Markets' stores sold a wider variety of products than the central building. Dry goods merchants comprised many original occupants, but there were also businesses selling clothing, bric-à-brac, and supplies, along with other businesses that provided services. Outside the buildings were carts and wagons selling merchandise, many of which were operated by farmers and rural butchers. They did not pay rent and could sell their goods on South Market Street without restriction. The first iteration of Quincy Market had few restaurants, which tended to be relatively short-lived.

One observer in the late 1830s described the central building as being frequently crowded on Saturdays, with flowers and foods being arranged throughout. The market was increasingly dominated by food wholesalers by the 1840s, some of whom moved to the North and South Markets. Agricultural businesses, sail and awning manufacturers, and restaurants began to crowd out the clothing stores there. Following the American Civil War in the mid-1860s, beef was the main food item sold at Quincy Market. Merchandise there was generally cheaper than in other Northeastern U.S. cities' markets. By the 1880s, food vendors had spread out to the North and South Markets, while farm and seed-related businesses occupied more of the central building. Quincy Market was the center of Boston's marketplace district by the late 19th century, although beef sales declined in the 1890s due to increasing imports. An article from 1898 described the central building as having 130 stalls and 22 cellar spaces, occupied by 86 merchants.

In the 1900s, the central building still actively sold produce, although goods were increasingly being delivered by land. Many seafood merchants moved away after 1914, when the fish industry moved to South Boston. By the early 1920s, the North and South Markets mostly housed food-related businesses, including restaurants, along with some dry goods stores. The North Market's non-food businesses included stationery stores, communications businesses, barbers, and tailors, while the South Market contained several vehicular-machinery businesses. Merchants fled in the mid-20th century due to the Great Depression and the growing dominance of rail freight, a situation worsened by the Central Artery's construction in the 1950s. The remaining vendors did not adapt their businesses to the area's changing needs.

=== Current marketplace (1976–present) ===
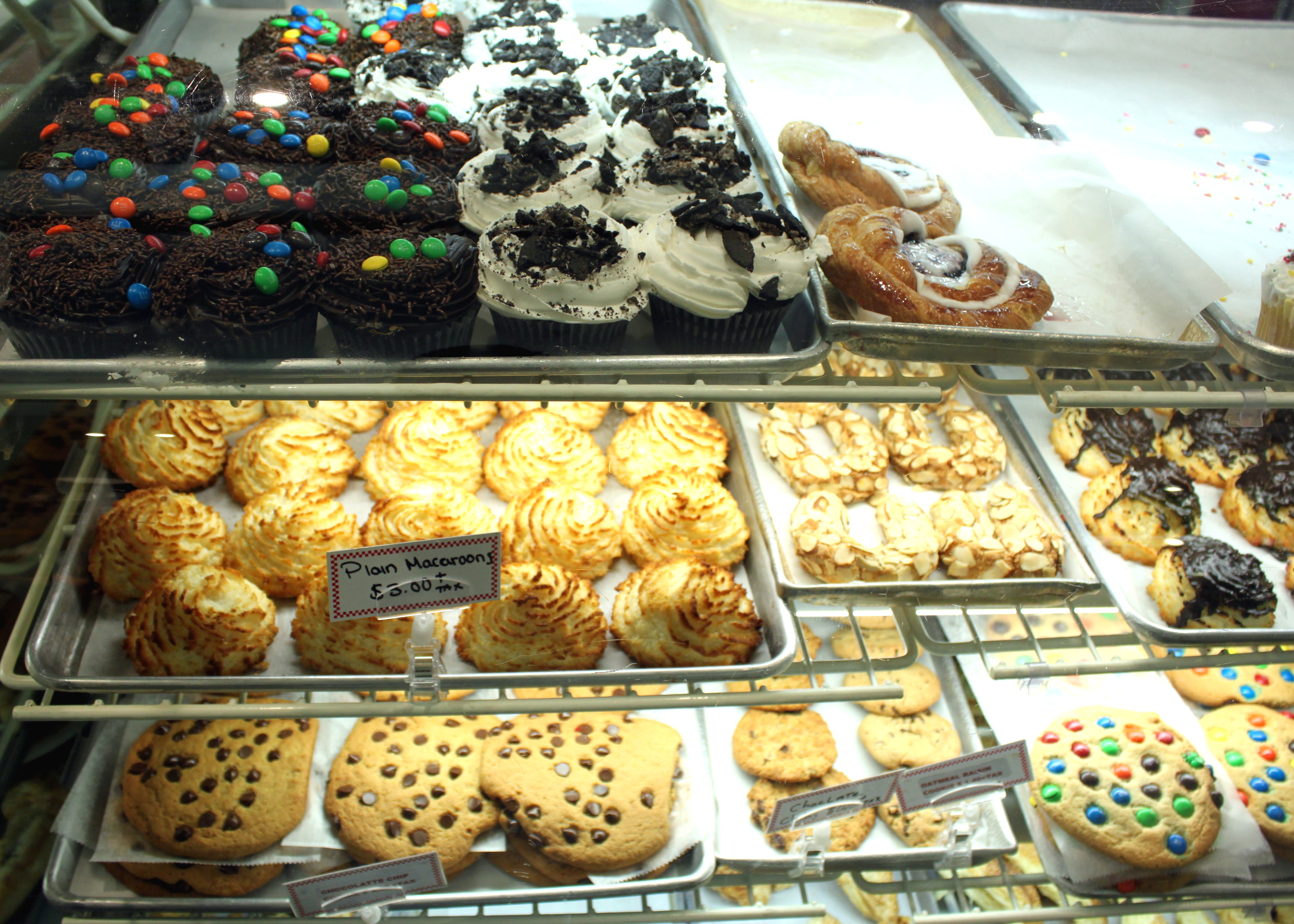
Food being sold at the modern Quincy Market (September 2012)

When the Rouse Company redeveloped Quincy Market in the 1970s, the complex had no anchor tenant, and the spaces were leased to small businesses. The central building originally had 63 shops, many of which sold food products, as the original marketplace had. The central building also had enclosed restaurants and non-food merchandise. The South Market initially housed apparel and accessories shops, restaurants, and offices, as well as a short-lived annex of the Boston Museum of Fine Arts. The North Market had a similar collection of retailers to the South Market. By the 1980s, many local merchants' shops had been replaced with major brand stores, such as the Disney Store. A commission overseeing the tenants themselves, as stipulated in Rouse's lease, had never been created.

The complex had almost 100 non-retail occupants by the early 2000s, in addition to more than three dozen pushcart vendors. Street performers from around the world auditioned for permits to perform outside Quincy Market. By mid-decade, national chains accounted for over half the complex's retail space, and the number of tenants had declined to 84. During Ashkenazy's ownership in the 2010s, it leased space to additional major brands, such as a Margaritaville restaurant and a Build-A-Bear Workshop store, prompting concerns that the changes could reduce the viability of small businesses, By the time J. Safra acquired the complex, many shops were vacant.

== Impact ==
=== Reception ===
==== Original structures ====
Quincy Market's architecture was widely praised when it was completed. During construction, one magazine predicted that the complex would be "an ornament to the city", while a newspaper writer praised the use of granite and Parris's overall design. Abel Bowen of the Boston News-Letter and City Record said in 1826 that the finished buildings' appearance had persuaded even those who had once criticized the large proportions. An observer from 1838 said, "We boast, and justly, of our Philadelphia market-house, or rather our street of market-houses; but Boston goes far ahead of us in this matter." In the 1870s, Samuel Adams Drake praised the central building's interior as compelling and a "model of its kind", and American Architect and Building News called it "a Doric temple stretched out to an unconscionable length". The Cultivator & Country Gentleman, in 1892, called the central building "a museum in itself" and possibly Boston's most attractive place.

Wolf Von Eckardt of The Washington Post wrote that, prior to the 1970s redevelopment, the North and South Markets had "grown organically" and that their designs reflected the needs of their old occupants. In the 1970s, The New York Times described Quincy Market's central building as "both practical and imposing", in part because of the porticoes, first-floor colonnade, and dome, while the Boston Globe praised the "doric simplicity".

The buildings' arrangement has also received commentary. The Christian Science Monitor described it favorably as "America's first 'urban renewal project'". The Boston Globe said in 1964 that Faneuil Hall and the adjoining market buildings formed "one of the finest urban spaces in America". A Chicago Tribune article from 1980 described Quincy Market as one of "three great focal points of pedestrian activity" in Downtown Boston, along with Government Center and Boston Common. In the 21st century, Jane Holtz Kay called the buildings "the city's and perhaps America's most striking urban development", and a writer for Change Over Time said the buildings were "an important contribution to the canon of great American architecture".

==== Redevelopment commentary ====
In 1974, Robert Campbell of The Boston Globe likened Quincy Market's restoration to that of Virginia's Colonial Williamsburg, calling it a reenactment of the original design. Writing about Quincy Market, a New York Times writer said that the "bastardization of one of the nation's most revered areas" had been averted only with great effort. When Faneuil Hall Marketplace opened, a writer for The New York Times described the ambiance as having a "Bloomingdale's sensitivity", catering mainly to the young and wealthy, and another writer for the same newspaper said that Thompson's changes were respectful of the original design. The Christian Science Monitor wrote that the renovated complex encouraged interaction and evoked earlier ideas for the buildings, and The Tampa Tribune wrote that the complex combined "the merchant spirit of the past and the vitality of the present". Conversely, Campbell wrote that North End merchants had criticized the complex as a "cleaner, brighter Hollywood version of the same thing". A critic for The Baltimore Sun said that, in contrast to Baltimore's Harborplace, Faneuil Hall Marketplace was cut off from the waterfront, and the upper stories were disconnected.

By the 21st century, Quincy Market and Faneuil Hall were described in The Republican as a tourist trap, and online reviews often complained of overcrowding. A Boston Globe writer said the Big Dig's removal revealed the proximity of Boston Harbor and made the marketplace "the bridge from the city it was always meant to be", despite the increasing numbers of big-brand stores. Architectural Record wrote in 2009 that, even with its national-chain stores, the complex "has maintained its vitality, and to this day emanates a youthful optimism". The architectural critic Alexandra Lange wrote that Faneuil Hall Marketplace was successful because it "felt special, a treat within a city with other centers but a hole at its heart".

=== Influence on other buildings ===
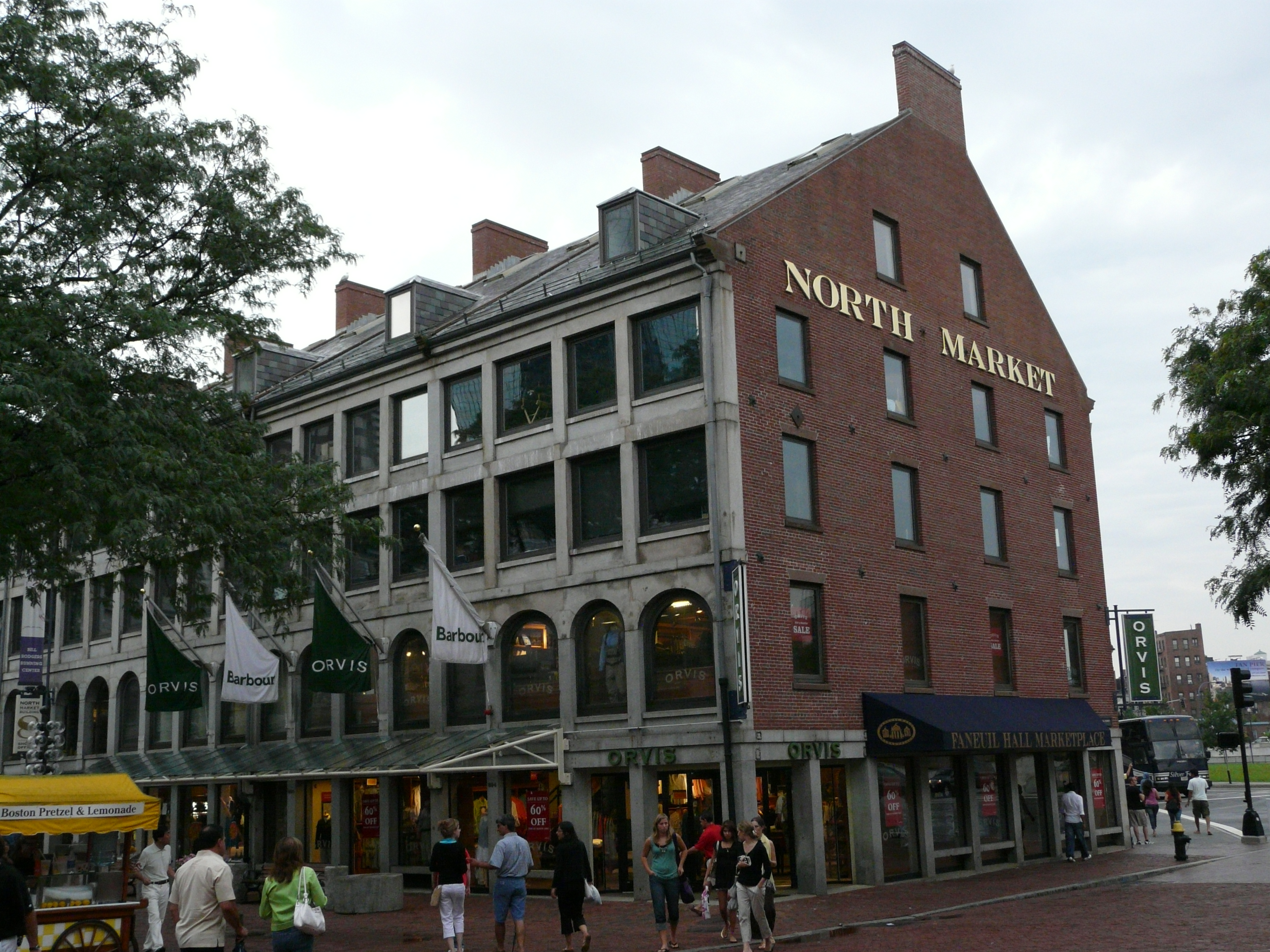
The three buildings, including North Market (pictured in 2008), made extensive use of large granite blocks.

When Quincy Market was built, it included innovative structural features for its time. The three buildings made extensive use of large granite blocks, which were laid on their shortest dimensions to create trabeated window openings, the oldest known to still exist in Boston. The buildings also included wood trusses, iron tie rods, and iron compression columns, at a time when structural iron was still rare. For the central building, Parris created a double-shell dome made of layered wooden planks, eliminating the need for large trusses. Parris's use of trabeated granite openings was widely emulated. Many nearby buildings had trabeated openings by the late 1820s, and that structural system became a forebear for early skyscraper construction. As Boston grew in the 1840s, builders and designers sought to model their buildings on Quincy Market, even though the original plans had been lost. The style also inspired several mid-19th-century railroad stations in New England, including a Boston and Maine Railroad station in nearby Haymarket Square (later replaced by North Station).

The marketplace's redevelopment inspired the development of similar shopping districts elsewhere; in the U.S., these included San Francisco's Fisherman's Wharf and Tampa's Shoppes at Harbour Island. Rouse and Thompson developed several American marketplaces inspired by Faneuil Hall Marketplace, including South Street Seaport, Bayside Marketplace, Harborplace, and Jacksonville Landing. Marketplaces developed by Rouse without Thompson included the Portside Festival Marketplace, the 6th Street Marketplace, The Shops at National Place, and St. Louis Union Station. In addition, Faneuil Hall Marketplace inspired redevelopment efforts in cities as far away as Glasgow and Tokyo, and it influenced the redevelopment of warehouses in London's Covent Garden. The writer John Quincy said in 2003 that Faneuil Hall Marketplace "was viewed as one of the great economic success stories in America" for its profitability and popularity.

=== Landmark designations, awards, and media ===
All three buildings were designated a National Historic Landmark and listed on the National Register of Historic Places on November 13, 1966. They were also nominated for designation as Boston Landmarks in the 1970s. The central building's exterior, some interior spaces, and surrounding streets were designated in 1996, and the North and South Market buildings were designated as well in 2024. The city landmark designations required any structural changes to be approved by the city government.

For his design of the redevelopment, Thompson received the Harleston Parker Medal in 1977 and the American Institute of Architects' (AIA) Gold Medal in 1991. The Faneuil Hall Marketplace ranked 64th on the AIA's 2007 List of America's Favorite Architecture, which listed the top 150 buildings in the United States. Faneuil Hall Marketplace received the AIA's Twenty-five Year Award for design excellence in 2009, and it was also detailed in a 2003 book by John Quincy Jr.

== See also ==
- List of National Historic Landmarks in Boston
- National Register of Historic Places listings in northern Boston, Massachusetts
- Market House (Fayetteville, North Carolina), a functionally similar National Historic Landmark
- City Market (Charleston, South Carolina), a functionally similar National Historic Landmark
