= Ellen Goodman =

American journalist and writer

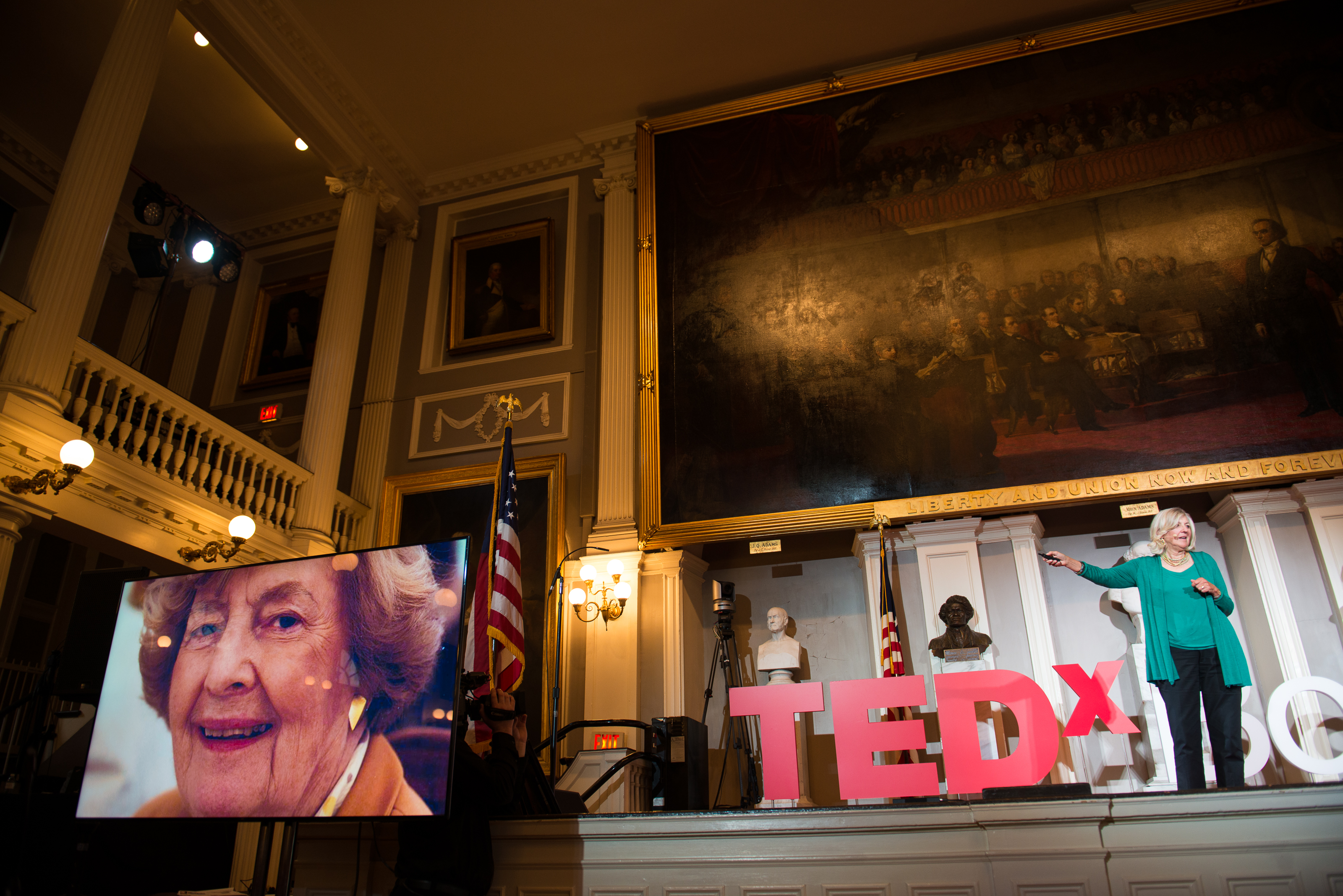
- Goodman gives a TEDx Talk
- Born: April 11, 1941 (age 85); Newton, Massachusetts, US
- Education: Radcliffe College
- Awards: Pulitzer Prize 1980

Ellen Goodman (born April 11, 1941) is an American journalist and syndicated columnist. She won a Pulitzer Prize in 1980. She is also a speaker and commentator.

== Career ==
Goodman's career began as a researcher and reporter for Newsweek magazine between 1963 and 1965. She was a reporter at the Detroit Free Press starting in 1965 and has worked as an associate editor at The Boston Globe since 1967. Her column was syndicated by The Washington Post Writers Group in 1976.

In 1996, she taught at Stanford University as the first Lorry I. Lokey Visiting professor in Professional Journalism. In 1998, Goodman received the Elijah Parish Lovejoy Award as well as an honorary Doctor of Laws degree from Colby College. She compared "anthropogenic warming deniers" to holocaust deniers. She announced her retirement in her final column, which ran on January 1, 2010.

== Education ==
Goodman attended Brookline High School in Brookline, Massachusetts for two years and graduated in 1959 from Buckingham School, now Buckingham Browne & Nichols. She graduated cum laude from Radcliffe College in 1963 with a degree in modern European history, though she did not work on The Harvard Crimson as they did not yet accept women. A year later, she returned to Harvard as a Nieman Fellow. At Harvard, Goodman studied the dynamics of social change. In 2007, Goodman studied gender and the news at John F. Kennedy School of Government where she was a Shorenstein Fellow.

== Personal life ==
Goodman was born to a Jewish family in Newton, Massachusetts, to Jackson Jacob Holtz, and Edith (née Weinstein) Holtz. Her elder sister was the late critic and author Jane Holtz Kay. She married her first husband, Anthony Goodman, in 1963 and in 1968, gave birth to their daughter Katie Goodman, a musical comedian. After the couple divorced, she married Boston Globe journalist Robert Levey in 1982. Her stepson, Gregory Levey, died by self-immolation in 1991 protesting the First Gulf War.

== Awards ==
Goodman won the Pulitzer Prize for Commentary in 1980. Another accolade is the American Society of Newspaper Editors' (now the American Society of News Editors) Distinguished Writing Award (1980). In 1988, Goodman won the Hubert H. Humphrey Civil Rights Award from the Leadership Conference on Civil Rights.

She was awarded the President's Award by the National Women's Political Caucus in 1993. A year later, she was given the American Woman Award by the Women's Research & Education Institute. In 2008, she won the Ernie Pyle Award for Lifetime Achievement from the National Society of Newspaper Columnists. She was awarded the Ashoka Fellowship in 2014 for her work.

== The Conversation Project ==
In 2010, Goodman started "The Conversation Project", a group dedicated to the wishes of end-of-life care. Goodman serves as the co-founder and director of the group.

== Books ==
- Turning Points (1979)
- Close to Home (1979)
- At Large (1981)
- Keeping in Touch (1985)
- Making Sense (1989)
- Value Judgments (1993)
- I Know Just What You Mean: the power of friendship in women's lives (2000), by Goodman and Patricia O'Brien
- Paper Trail: common sense in uncommon times (2004)
