= Encore career =

Second career focused on "giving back"

An encore career or second career is paid work later in a person's life that combines continued income, greater personal meaning, and social impact. These jobs are often in public interest fields, such as education, the environment, health, the government sector, social services, and other non-profits.

The phrase 'encore career' was made popular by Marc Freedman, who founded Civic Ventures, an organization involved with the work-life of senior citizens.

== Popular use of the term ==
Nicholas Kristof, writing in the New York Times, notes that Bill Gates' switched to working full-time for his foundation "is part of a booming trend: the 'encore career' as a substitute for retirement. Definitions are still in flux, but an encore career typically aims to provide a dose of personal satisfaction by 'giving back.'" Kristof writes: "If more people take on encore careers… the boomers who arrived on the scene by igniting a sexual revolution could leave by staging a give-back revolution. Boomers may just be remembered more for what they did in their 60s than for what they did in the Sixties." Ellen Goodman cites Al Gore as a "poster child, the model for what Marc Freedman calls the 'encore career.'"

== Research ==
In 2008, Peter D. Hart Research Associates, Inc., surveyed 1,063 Americans about their interest in encore careers. This survey found that 5.3 million to 8.4 million people were then in encore careers: "The survey results suggest that the number of people choosing encore careers could grow rapidly. Of those not already in encore careers, half say they are interested in moving into jobs in such fields as education, health care, government, and the nonprofit sector." A companion survey found that half of nonprofit employers found hiring encore workers "highly appealing." Those with experience hiring older adults were most enthusiastic about doing it again.

In 2011, Penn Schoen Berland conducted research on interest in encore careers. The research – which included a telephone survey of 930 Americans and an online survey of 1,408 Americans, ages 44 to 70 – found that as many as 9 million Americans in that age range are in encore careers and another 31 million Americans want encore careers. Those in encore careers, on average, started to think about their encores at age 50 and took about 18 months to make the transition. The research also found that nearly 67% of those in encore careers experienced reduced or no income during the transition.
