= Jane Holtz Kay =

American urban design and architecture critic

Jane Holtz Kay (born Jane Holtz; July 7, 1938, Boston – died November 4, 2012) was an American urban design and architecture critic. A columnist for The Nation, The Boston Globe and The New York Times, she authored three books on the conservation of natural and urban environments, most notably Asphalt Nation: How the Automobile Took Over America and How We Can Take It Back.

Kay grew up in the Boston suburb of Brookline with her younger sister, Ellen. After graduating from Buckingham School, she studied at Radcliffe College, majoring in American history.

In 1960, she wrote her senior thesis on the historian and urban critic Lewis Mumford. His writings became a big influence on hers, and she visited him several times in the following decades. Kay began her career in journalism as a reporter for The Patriot Ledger, based in Quincy, Massachusetts, but later worked primarily as a freelance writer and author.

Kay wrote columns for The Nation and The Boston Globe, and contributed several articles to The New York Times "design notebook" column. Her first book, Lost Boston, was published in 1980. It portrays buildings in Boston which had been demolished to build malls, roads or parking spaces. It was followed by Preserving New England (1986), which she had written with Pauline Chase Harrell. Her most influential book, however, is Asphalt Nation: How the Automobile Took Over America and How We Can Take It Back, a critique of the car's dominance on American culture published in 1997. In 1991, Kay had sold her car and moved to the Back Bay neighborhood of Boston.

== Death ==
Jane Holtz Kay died November 4, 2012, at the Springhouse Senior Community in Jamaica Plain, aged 74, from Alzheimer's disease.

== Books ==
- 1980: Lost Boston. Boston: Houghton Mifflin; ISBN 0-395-27609-8.
- 1986: Preserving New England: Connecticut, Rhode Island, Massachusetts, Vermont, New Hampshire, Maine. New York: Pantheon Books; ISBN 0-394-74395-4 (with Pauline Chase Harrell)
- 1997: Asphalt Nation: How the Automobile Took Over America and How We Can Take It Back. New York: Crown Publishers; ISBN 0-517-58702-5.
