= Tish Sommers =

American author and women's rights activist

- Tish Sommers, from a 1982 newspaper
- Born: Letitia Gale Innes; September 8, 1914; Cambria, California
- Died: October 18, 1985 (aged 71); Oakland, California
- Other names: Letitia Burke, Letitia Sommers
- Occupations: Activist, writer

Letitia "Tish" Innes Sommers (September 8, 1914 – October 18, 1985) was an American author, women's rights activist, and the co-founder and first president of the Older Women's League (OWL).

== Early life and education ==
Letitia Gale Innes was born in Cambria, California and raised in San Francisco, the daughter of Murray Innes and Katherine Dorsch Innes. Her father was a mining engineer, and her mother was a teacher. She studied dance as a young woman, including three years in Germany in the 1930s. She attended the University of California, Los Angeles.

== Career and activism ==
During World War II, Innes worked in the parks department in Los Angeles. In 1945 she directed a youth theatrical production in Los Angeles with over 150 youth participants, and chaired the program for a "thanksgiving harvest festival" in the city. In the 1950s, Sommers and her second husband worked for social and civil rights causes in the South.

In the 1970s, Sommers became focused on feminist issues, especially involving older women. With the help of her friend Laurie Shields, she successfully lobbied 39 states and Congress to pass displaced homemaker laws, which offered a network of job training and counseling centers for career housewives who went through divorce or the death of a husband. Sommers coined the phrase "displaced homemaker."

Sommers chaired the National Organization for Women's task force on older women in the 1970s. She was also a NOW board member and led the Jobs for Older Women Action Project. She co-founded the Older Women's League with Laurie Shields in 1980, and was its first president.

Sommers was named one of the "Bay Area's Ten Most Distinguished Persons" by the San Francisco Chronicle in 1974. She testified before a Senate committee on aging and Social Security in 1975. She won the Western Gerontological Society Award in 1979, and the Unitarian Universalist Women's Federation's Ministry to Women Award in 1981. In 1982, already facing a cancer diagnosis, she was keynote speaker at a conference on employment at Sonoma State University. In 1983, she testified before a Congressional hearing on Medicare and aging. In 1984, she once again spoke before a Congressional committee on aging and healthcare.

== Publications ==
- The not-so-helpless female: How to change the world even if you never thought you could; A step-by-step guide to social action (1973)
- "Freelance Agitator Argues for Hiring Changes: Look Out Job Market!" (1978)
- "If We Could Write the Script..." (1980)
- "If I Had a Billion..." (1981)
- "Caregiving: A Woman's Issue" (1985)
- "Three Caregivers Tell Their Stories: Seriously Near the Breaking Point" (1985)
- Women Take Care: The Consequences of Caregiving in Today's Society (1987, with Laurie Shields)

== Personal life and legacy ==
Innes married Sidney Arnold Burke in 1938; they later divorced. She married fellow activist Joseph Sommers in 1949; they adopted a son, and divorced in 1972. "Undoubtedly the divorce was, in part, my own awakening," she later recalled. Sommers died from cancer in 1985 at the age of 71, in Oakland. Some of her papers are held in the San Diego State University Libraries. The Institute for Health and Aging at the University of California, San Francisco established the Tish Sommers Senior Scholars program to honor her; it supports the work of older graduate and postdoctoral students working to improve the lives of older women. In 1984, the American Humanist Association awarded her the Humanist Heroine Award. In 1991, a biography of her was published, titled Tish Sommers, Activist: and the Founding of the Older Women's League.
