= Widowed Persons Service =

Widowed Persons Service is an American organization designed to provide support for widows and widowers by people who have themselves lost a spouse.

AARP established Widowed Persons Service in 1973. As of 1998, WPS had a network of around 300 chapters.
