= List of companies based in Washington, D.C. =

The following list shows companies with headquarters in Washington, D.C. Fortune 500's 2022 list of largest companies includes 16 with headquarters in the D.C. region.

== Companies based in Washington D.C. ==
=== A ===
- Albright Stonebridge Group
- Amtrak
- Arabella Advisors
- The Asia Group

=== B ===
- Beacon Global Strategies
- Blue State Digital

=== C ===
- Capstone Development
- The Carlyle Group
- COMSAT

=== D ===
- Danaher Corporation
- D.C. United Holdings
- Diego's Hair Salon
- Dutko Worldwide

=== E ===
- EAB
- EIG Global Energy Partners

=== F ===
- Fort Myer Construction
- Framebridge
- FTI Consulting
- Fundrise

=== G ===
- Gallup, Inc.
- Goddard Gunster
- Greenfield Belser

=== H ===
- HelloWallet

=== K ===
- Kiplinger
- Kramers

=== L ===
- Logik

=== M ===
- Magruder's
- MDB Communications
- Mobilize
- Moby Dick

=== N ===
- National Trust Community Investment Corporation
- NGP VAN

=== P ===
- Pepco
- Podesta Group
- Promontory Financial Group

=== Q ===
- Quadrangle Development Corporation

=== R ===
- Regnery Publishing
- Rodman's Grocery

=== S ===
- The Scowcroft Group
- Selmedica
- Smith Brandon International

=== U ===
- United Income

=== V ===
- Vodium

=== Z ===
- Zonda Home
