= Native Commerce =

- Website type: Content & Commerce
- Available in: English
- Founded: Dec 2012
- Owners: Perry Belcher, Ryan Deiss, Roland Frasier
- Website: nativecommerce.com
- Registration: Required
- Users: 7 million active users (October 2016)
- Current status: Defunct
- Key People: Keren Kang (CEO)

Native Commerce was an American digital marketing and e-commerce company founded by the same digital marketing team behind DigitalMarketer.com. They build communities, the brands, and the commerce.

== History ==
The company was founded by Perry Belcher, Ryan Deiss, Roland Frasier in 2012 with Keren Kang as the CEO. Sites include Survival Life, DIY Projects, Makeup Tutorials, Gun Carrier, Sewing, Nail Designs, Cute Outfits, Garden Season, and Homesteading.

Associations of Native Commerce include the National Craft Association, the Family Protection Association, the American Beauty Association, and The American Gun Association.

Ecommerce brands include Mason & Ivy, Hong Kong Tailor, The Survival Life Store, Hoffman Richter, Hybeam. The company ranked #412 on the Inc 5000 in 2016.

In 2017, the company changed to Native Commerce Media, which is now Plattr, an digital marketing agency specializing in healthcare marketing, SEO, content marketing, and social media marketing.

== Native Commerce Affiliated Brands ==
- Survival Life (now owned by Olympus Peak Media)
- Gun Carrier (now owned by Olympus Peak Media)
- Makeup Tutorials (now owned by Rival Brands)
- DIY Projects (now owned by Rival Brands)
- Homesteading (now owned by Rival Brands)
