= Capstone Development =

US real estate development company

Capstone Development LLC
- Type: Privately held company
- Industry: Real estate development
- Founded: Washington, D.C., U.S. (2009)
- Headquarters: Washington, D.C., U.S.
- Area served: United States
- Key people: Norman K. Jenkins, President and CEO
- Products: Hotels
- Website: www.capstonedevco.com

Capstone Development LLC is a privately held real estate development company based in Washington, D.C., in the United States. It was formed in 2009. As of January 2013, it owned six hotels along the East Coast and in the Deep South. The company has two subsidiaries. Capstone Management Services provides hotel management services, and Capstone Procurement provides food service and janitorial supplies for hotels.

== Corporate history ==
Capstone Development was founded by Norman Jenkins in February 2009. Jenkins, a highly regarded senior vice president at Marriott International and African American, helped Marriott launch a Diversity Ownership Initiative in 2005 which worked to improve hotel franchise ownership among minorities. A year later, Jenkins oversaw a cooperative venture between Marriott and RLJ Hotels (the hotel investment operation of cable TV magnate Robert L. Johnson). The joint venture purchased 90 hotels, and left RLJ Hotels as one of Marriott's largest co-investors. Jenkins also convinced Marriott to build a Residence Inn in downtown Silver Spring, Maryland. The hotel helped revitalize Silver Spring's downtown business district.

Jenkins announced his departure from Marriott in late November 2008. After 16 years at Marriott, Jenkins departed on January 1, 2009. In February 2009, Jenkins formed Capstone Development LLC with money from private equity funds, wealthy investors, and his own money. The company said in February 2009 that it already had good relationships with banks willing to give it development loans.

Capstone's strategy is to acquire or build hotels in the mid-Atlantic region in the United States. Company executives say their strategy is to focus on specialty hotels, hotels in markets that have high barriers to entry, and hotels that are market leaders. The company also said it would engage in public-private finance and development partnerships, as Jenkins had extensive experience in that area. At the time it formed, Capstone Development executives said they already had five projects in development and another four in the development planning stage. Some of these were public-private developments.

== Projects ==
- 3 Palms Oceanfront Resort in Myrtle Beach, South Carolina. Finished in early 2011, this is Capstone's only full-service resort property.
- Courtyard by Marriott in Atlanta, Georgia. This hotel opened in February 2011. Capstone agreed to sell this property to Summit Hotel Properties November 2011 for $28.65 million.
- Washington Marriott Marquis, a $520 million hotel jointly financed by Capstone, the District of Columbia, and Quadrangle Development Corporation. It was under construction as of 2012, with an anticipated opening date of May 2014.
- Heartsease at Shallotte is an 83-unit craftsman-style cottage community in Shallotte, North Carolina. In 2023, Capstone completed a $21.5 million luxury single-family rental development project.

The hotel opened on May 1, 2014.

=== Projects in development ===
In September 2011, Capstone said it had signed an agreement with Marriott International to build a Residence Inn and a Courtyard by Marriott on a parcel of Marriott-owned land just north of the Washington Marriott Marquis. The two hotels combined would have 500 rooms and cost a total of $172 million. The development partners asked the District of Columbia for $35 million in tax increment financing, although at that time the city said it was unlikely to provide this.

In 2009, Capstone Development also submitted a proposal to redevelop the historic Stevens Elementary School in the West End neighborhood of Washington, D.C. However, Capstone's proposal did not make the short list of acceptable proposals.
