= Burkey Belser =

American graphic designer (1947–2023)

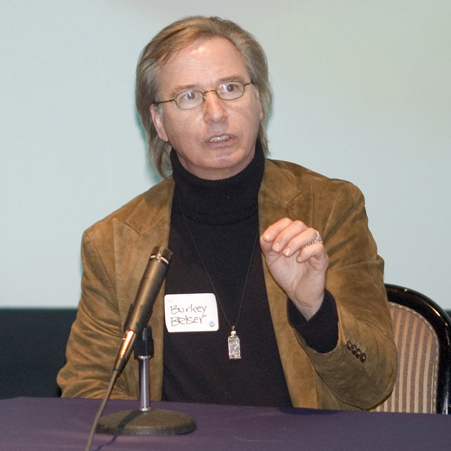
- Born: James Burkey Belser; July 8, 1947; Columbia, South Carolina, U.S.
- Died: September 25, 2023 (aged 76); Bethesda, Maryland, U.S.
- Education: Davidson College (BA)
- Occupation: Graphic designer
- Notable work: Nutrition Facts label; EnergyGuide
- Spouse: Donna Greenfield (m. 1978)
- Children: 2

James Burkey Belser (July 8, 1947 – September 25, 2023) was an American graphic designer. He is best known for his design of the nutrition facts label, the U.S. Food and Drug Administration (FDA) mandated food labeling system that appears on all packaged foods in the United States, which has been called by some "the most frequently reproduced graphic in the world." He is also widely known for the pioneering work in legal advertising that earned him a Lifetime Achievement Award from the Legal Marketing Association as well as induction into that organization's Hall of Fame.

== Early life, family and education ==
Burkey Belser was born July 8, 1947, in Columbia, South Carolina. The Belser family has been long-established in the South, with Christian Belser (1752–1812) arriving in Charleston from Baden-Baden, Duchy of Württemberg in 1787. A family plantation, Sunnyside on Edisto, South Carolina, has been exclusively in family hands from the Mikell side of the family for over 300 years. Summer-long stays in the natural setting of the plantation awakened his artistic predilection. He took painting and drawing courses at the University of South Carolina when he was eight years old. He redrew entire issues of The New Yorker cartoons before settling on favorite cartoonists such as William Steig and Charles Barsotti.

His parents divorced in 1952. Belser lived another two years in Columbia with his mother and sister before moving with them and his stepfather to Birmingham, Alabama, for a year, in Memphis, Tennessee. Belser was given the President's Award by the student body, an award given to the individual judged to have contributed most to the high school. He was an Eagle Scout and earned the God and Country award.

US Nutrition facts label

Belser was not initially trained in graphic design. He was an English major and an art minor at Davidson College in North Carolina; the school offered no graphic design courses. He then spent a year studying French literature at the University of Montpellier in France.

== Career ==
During the decade following college, Belser trained himself to be a designer. He joined the provocative magazine published by Ralph Ginzburg, Avant Garde, in New York City, ultimately becoming its circulation director. After a year at the magazine, Belser left to travel from Istanbul to Kathmandu. Upon returning, he settled in Washington, D.C., and became the business manager for The Righteous Apple, a graphic design studio created for the non-profit black cultural arts organization, New Thing Art & Architecture Center.

In 1978, he launched his own design firm, Burkey Belser Inc. That same year, he married lawyer Donna Greenfield. They later merged his company with her consulting firm into Greenfield/Belser Ltd. Belser began working with law firms shortly after the Bates v. State Bar of Arizona decision in 1977 allowed lawyers to advertise.

Belser's first brochure for a law firm was designed in 1983 for the Virginia firm of McGuire Woods & Battle. It was a 12-page hardcover book, modeled on 18th-century book design. The brochure took a Gold Award at the Art Directors Club of Washington, D.C., proving that design for law firms could be done in an instructive, informative and innovative manner. Belser quickly expanded the tactical and graphical legal vocabulary, creating the very first ads for a law firm, Howrey & Simon, in 1992. He was also among the first to create a law firm logo, a "designed" law firm website, law firm newsletters and every other marketing tool that corporations use routinely today but that were simply unknown in the legal industry at that time. The transformation of marketing in the legal industry was not unlike that of the banking industry in the 1970s and the accounting industry shortly thereafter—all of which had been for centuries either not permitted to "advertise" or bound by custom and decorum from doing so.

In 1992, he was contacted by David Aaron Kessler's staff at the FDA to help with the Nutrition Facts label, because of his prior success designing the EnergyGuide that appears on all major appliances in the US. Because Congress had mandated the reformulation of the label but not its redesign, Belser undertook the project as a pro bono effort, for which he received a Presidential Design Award from President Bill Clinton. In an interview in Print magazine, the Italian designer Massimo Vignelli stated, "I applaud the person who designed the Nutrition Facts label that's on every food package now being sold in the US.", describing it as a "masterpiece of information architecture, and quite a victory for social responsibility."

The success of that initiative led the FDA to once again call on Belser to design the Drug Facts label that now appears on all over-the-counter drugs. Belser would later call the Nutrition Facts label an iconic "government brand", describing it as an example of how "design can work in the public interest."

== Personal life and death ==
In 1978, Belsen married lawyer Donna Greenfield. His company merged with her consulting firm to become Greenfield/Belser Ltd. Belser and Greenfield had two children.

Belser died of bladder cancer at his home in Bethesda, Maryland, on September 25, 2023, at age 76.

== Publications ==
Belser authored 25 Years of Legal Branding (Sunnyside Press) published in 2004, a compilation of the Greenfield/Belser Ltd's work from 1979 to 2004. His work also appears in other publications, including Absolutely the Newest Logos, Best of Corporate Identity Design, Big Book of Corporate Identity Designs (Watson-Guptill), Big Book of Design Ideas (Collins Design), Big Book of Letterhead and Website Designs (Watson-Guptill), Global Corporate Identity, Global Graphics: Symbols (Rockport Publishing), HOW Colossal Design, Large Graphics (Rockport Publishing), The Newest Logos, Promotions that Work (Rockport Publishing), Small Graphics (Rockport Publishing), White Graphics (Rockport Publishing).

== Awards ==
Belser was one of nine judges for the 2007 Communication Arts Design Annual, regarded by many as the nation's most prestigious graphic design competition. Since 1974, Belser has won hundreds of awards for his work in graphic design. Some of the competitions that have awarded him for his work include: AIGA 50, American Corporate Identity, Lifetime Achievement Award from the Art Directors Club of Metropolitan Washington, Communication Arts (Illustration Annual), Creativity magazine, American Graphic Design Awards (Graphic Design: USA), Graphis Inc., International Engraved Graphics Association, Legal Marketing Association Your Honor Awards, Logo 2000, 2002, Los Angeles Society of Illustrators, Print, Society for Marketing Professional Services, Webby Awards.
