= Washington Marriott Marquis =

Luxury hotel in Washington, D.C., US

Marriott Marquis Washington, DC

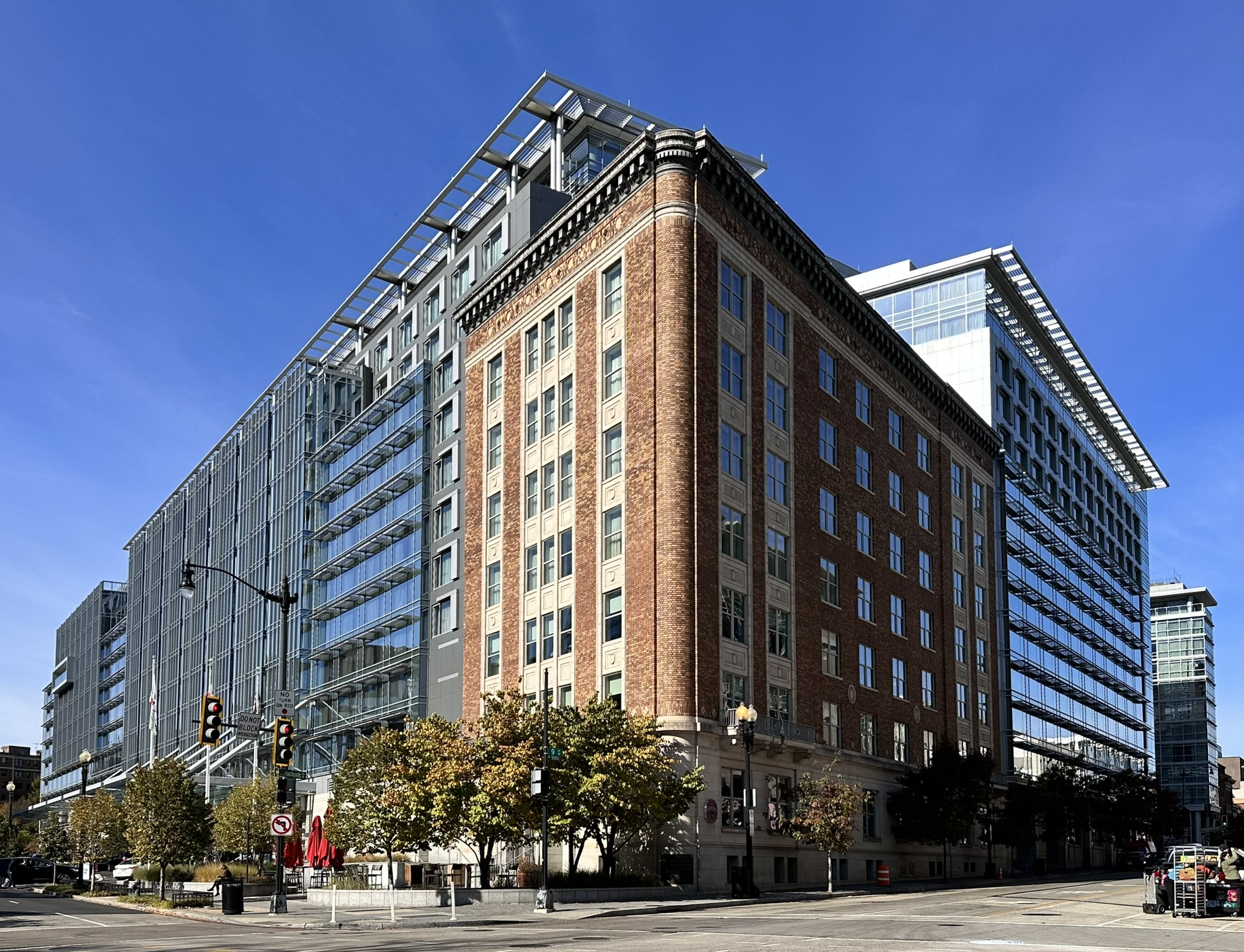
- Washington Marriott Marquis in 2023
- Interactive map of the Marriott Marquis Washington, DC area
- Hotel chain: Marriott Hotels & Resorts

General information
- Location: United States, 901 Massachusetts Avenue NW, Washington, D.C.
- Coordinates: 38.903574°N 77.024654°W
- Opened: May 1, 2014; 12 years ago
- Cost: $520 million
- Owner: Capstone Development; District of Columbia; ING Group; Marriott International; Quadrangle Development Corporation
- Operator: Marriott International

Technical details
- Floor count: 18 (14 above ground, 4 below ground)

Design and construction
- Architects: Cooper Carry and tvsdesign; BBGM (interior)

Other information
- Number of rooms: 1,175 rooms
- Number of suites: 49 suites
- Parking: 400 spaces

Website
- www.marriott.com/en-us/hotels/wasco-marriott-marquis-washington-dc/overview/

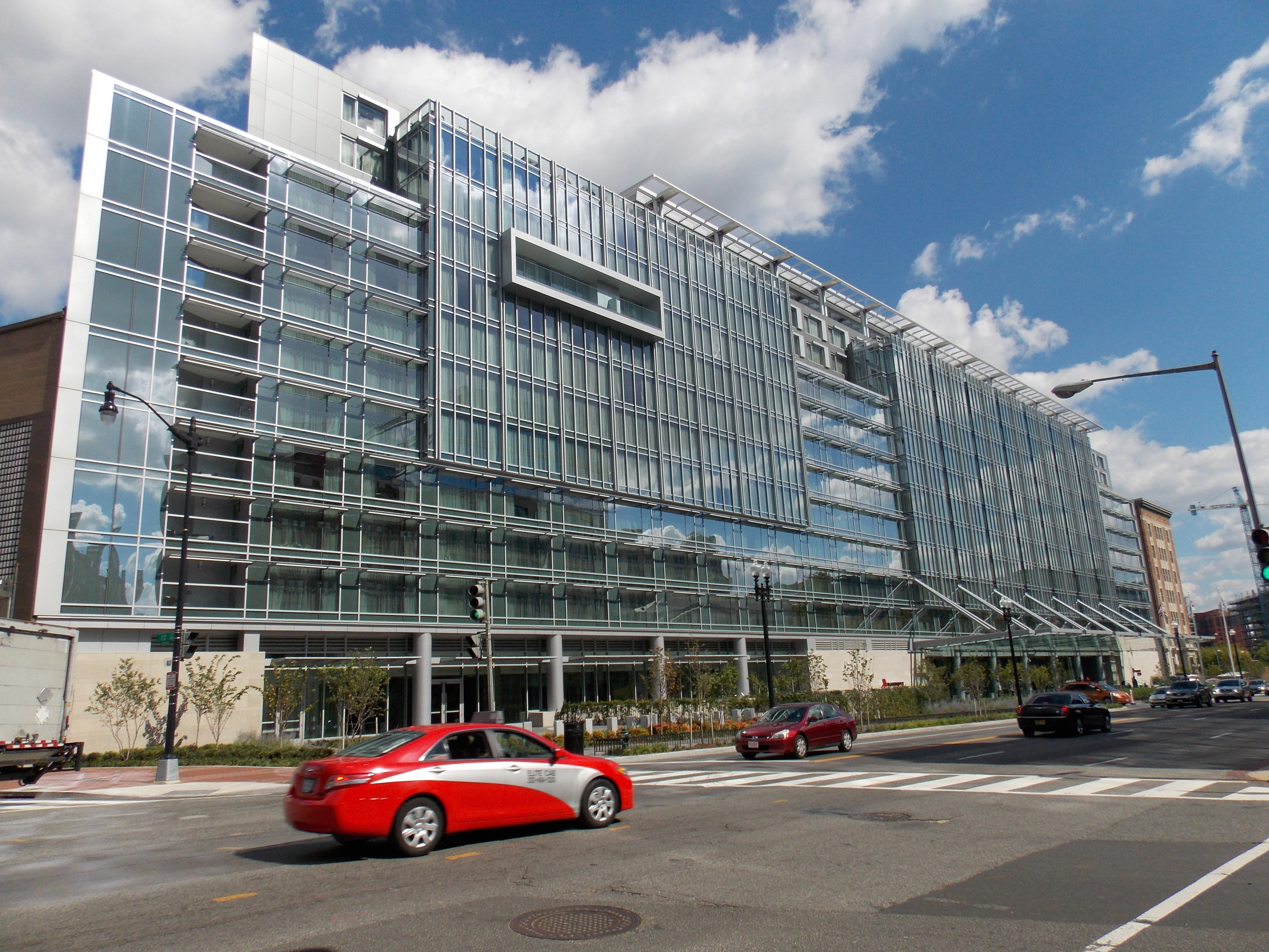
The hotel in October 2014

Marriott Marquis Washington, DC is a luxury hotel located on Massachusetts Avenue NW, in NW, Washington, D.C., United States. The hotel is connected to the Walter E. Washington Convention Center across 9th Street NW via an underground concourse and receives significant business from convention attendees.

The hotel has 100,000 square feet (9,300 m^{2}) of meeting room space, which includes a 30,000-square-foot (2,800 m^{2}) main ballroom and two smaller 10,800-square-foot (1,000 m^{2}) ballrooms. The building is topped by a 18,800-square-foot (1,750 m^{2}) glass-encased penthouse, and a 5,200-square-foot (480 m^{2}) outdoor event terrace.

The hotel is owned by Capstone Development, the District of Columbia, ING Group, Marriott International, and Quadrangle Development Corporation. The operator is Marriott International. It opened on May 1, 2014, and has 1,175 rooms (which includes 49 suites), a lobby with multi-story atrium, and four dining outlets on the first floor. The hotel has 14 stories above ground, and four stories below.

== New convention center ==
The Washington Convention Center, Washington, D.C.'s second convention center, opened on December 10, 1982. However, by 1990, the facility's small size and a nationwide boom in the construction of convention centers had caused the 285,000-square-foot (26,500 m^{2}) convention center to see a dramatic drop in business. In May 1990, the city unveiled plans for a new $685 million, 2.3-million-square-foot (210,000 m^{2}) convention center. Ground was broken for the new Walter E. Washington Convention Center on 2 October 1998, and it opened in 2003.

== Proposed convention center headquarters hotel ==
=== Consultant studies ===
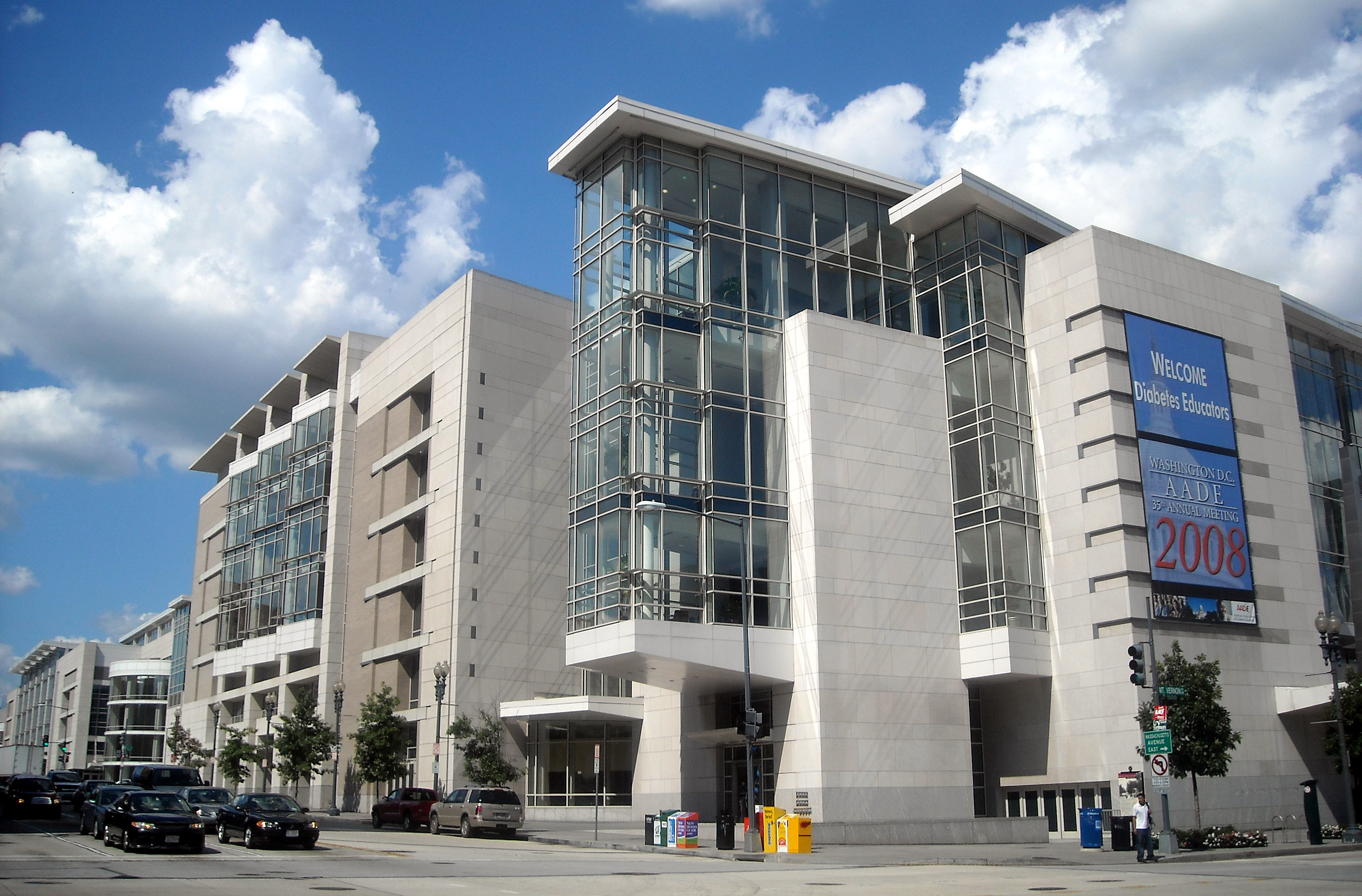
Groundbreaking for the Walter E. Washington Convention Center in 1998 led many to conclude that a "convention headquarters hotel" was needed.

With few hotels near the new convention center, there was a need for a "convention headquarters hotel". In May 1999, Monument Realty proposed constructing a 1,000-room convention headquarters hotel on a 51,000-square-foot (4,700 m^{2}) lot it owned on a roughly triangular parcel bounded by New York Avenue NW, K Street NW, and 10th Street NW. Monument estimated the hotel would cost $206 million. In order to make the venture profitable, the cost would need to be reduced to $169 million. Monument sought $57.3 million in tax increment financing (TIF) but never received approval from the city for the funds. In late October 2000, Monument Realty sold the parcel for $43.2 million to Boston Properties. An office building, 901 New York Avenue, was built on the site. In fall 1999, the Washington Renaissance Hotel at 9th and I Streets NW applied for $25 million in TIF money to expand into a convention headquarters hotel. But city officials turned down this request, saying there was significant risk it would not produce the tax revenue to make the TIF financially viable. D.C. Councilmember Jack Evans introduced legislation to award the TIF to the Washington Renaissance Hotel, but it did not pass and the hotel's owner sold the land on which the expansion would have occurred. The hotel would have expanded onto an empty lot on the northwest corner of 7th and I Streets NW. The International Brotherhood of Electrical Workers Building was constructed on this quarter-block site in 2004.

To decide if a convention center headquarters hotel was economically feasible, two studies were conducted in 2000. First, the city commissioned a study by the Chicago firm of C.H. Johnson Consulting. Assuming a 71% occupancy rate and average room rate of $215 a night on 1,500 rooms, the Johnson study found the hotel would generate $135 million in gross revenues in its first year, resulting in a $34 million deficit. Nevertheless, the Johnson study called the convention headquarters hotel a "necessary ingredient", citing the size of the new convention center, the distance (nearly 2 miles (3.2 km)) to the largest hotel, and the small size of nearby hotels. The Johnson study did not attempt to account for the economic impact of the hotel on other businesses in the city. Another study by PricewaterhouseCoopers, commissioned by the Washington Convention and Sports Authority (WCSA), found that in its fourth year of operation, the convention center would generate a demand for 55,500 more room nights than the city's existing hotels could accommodate. In time, PricewaterhouseCoopers concluded, the new convention center would generate demand for 500,000 room nights a year. However, the study also warned that any convention headquarters hotel would have to rely on non-convention meetings for a substantial portion of its business—putting it in competition with the smaller hotels in the city.

=== Request for proposals for a new hotel ===
By November 2000, discussion by private developers and the city focused less on whether to build a convention headquarters hotel but how large it should be. The new hotel needed 1,200 to 1,500 rooms and at least 80,000 square feet (7,400 m^{2}) of meeting room space. It also needed to be within walking distance of the new convention center. The city hired a consulting firm to determine if it would be financially viable to build a $400 million hotel on the following sites: the old convention center, along Massachusetts Avenue NW, or New York Avenue NW. Several large hotel operators expressed interest in building the new hotel, including the Hyatt and Marriott chains. However, no additional action was taken at that time.

Six months later, in April 2001, D.C. Mayor Anthony A. Williams announced he was issuing a request for proposals (RFPs) to build a 1,100-room, $200-million convention headquarters hotel near the site of the old convention center. Williams asked private developers to propose privately owned sites for the hotel. If no privately owned site was available, Williams offered to build the hotel on the site of the old convention center, even though a consultant's report said that would limit the development potential of that site. Williams said a decision on a proposal would be made by the end of the year, and left open the possibility that the city would subsidize the hotel's financing. Real estate developer Kingdon Gould III said he was willing to build a hotel on an 85,000-square-foot (7,900 m^{2}) lot he owned at the corner of Massachusetts Avenue NW and 9th Street NW. Similarly, developer Douglas Jemal offered a site he owned at 7th Street NW and New York Avenue NW.

Four proposals for the 1,000-plus room hotel, now priced at $300 million, were submitted by the August 2001 deadline. They included proposals by:

- Hilton Hotels & Resorts, Douglas Jemal, and Landmark Organization Inc. (a development company based in Austin, Texas) for a hotel on the northeast corner of 7th Street NW and New York Avenue NW
- Onyx International for a hotel on the north side of Massachusetts Avenue NW between 4th and 5th Streets NW
- Monument Realty for a hotel on K Street NW between 4th and 5th Streets NW
- Marriott International and Kingdon Gould III for a hotel along 9th Street NW between L Street NW and Massachusetts Avenue NW

Although the city targeted making a decision by December 2001, the September 11 attacks caused a severe economic downturn in Washington, D.C., which caused the city to delay its decision on the RFP for more than a year.

The award for the convention headquarters hotel went to Marriott International in October 2002. The award was not made until October 29, 2002. The mayor's office said the city would probably provide TIF financing to the project, which now was projected to have 1,500 rooms, 90,000 square feet (8,400 m^{2}) of meeting room space, cost $500 million, and open in late 2006 or early 2007. The Marriott/Gould bid was chosen because the land parcel size, its location near the convention center, and the land, which was already owned by the partners. City officials said they intended to ask the Council for legislation to establish a nonprofit to sell TIF bonds and own the hotel. Marriott said it would buy $24 million of the bonds to create an ownership interest in the hotel, which it said would be built by JBG Smith. To keep interest on the bonds reasonable, the city stated it would also seek authority to divert up to $19 million in general sales tax revenue in the event the hotel didn't generate enough revenue to pay interest on the TIF bonds.

=== Initial financing proposal ===
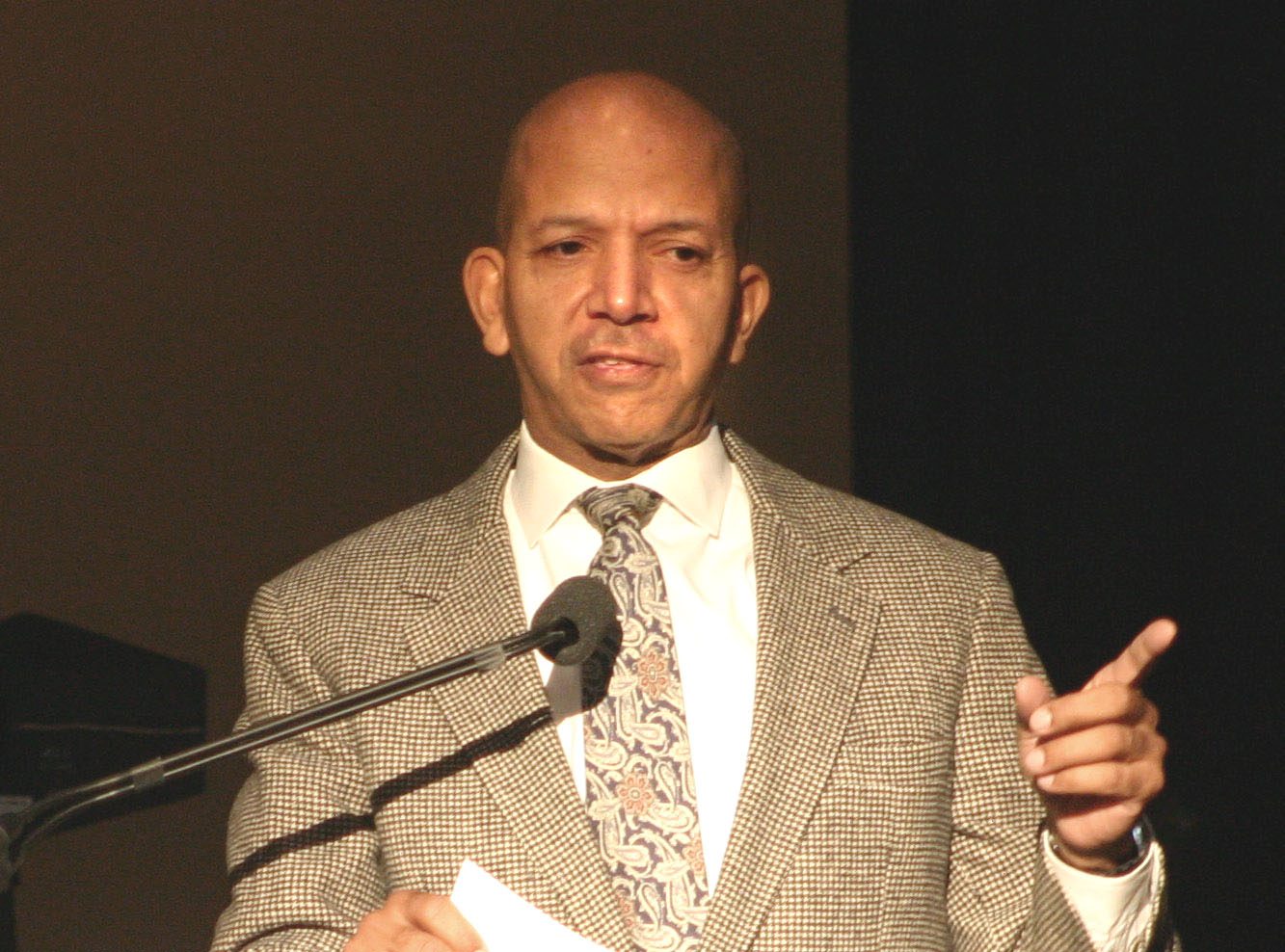
D.C. Mayor Anthony Williams (pictured) began the process leading to the construction of the Washington Marriott Marquis by issuing an RFP in April 2001.

The city's TIF financing proposal was controversial. Critics such as Charles W. McMillion, chief economist at the business consulting firm MBG Information Services, argued that the convention headquarters hotel would lead to lower sales tax revenue by reducing pressure on hotel room rates throughout the city and by keeping attendees away from local restaurants and retail businesses. The convention headquarters hotel, critics also noted, would not have enough attendance to make up the lost sales tax revenue. Executives at other hotel chains said the city's financing deal projected sales tax revenue of $40 million to $48 million a year, but a more reasonable estimate was $25 million to $30 million a year. City officials countered by pointing to the two studies conducted in 2000 which came to different conclusions, and by noting that the convention center had promised those booking large meetings at the site that a headquarters hotel would be open by 2007. Without the hotel, these groups could cancel completely, they said.

On March 29, 2003, the $600 million Walter E. Washington Convention Center officially opened.

It took more than a year for the city to work out its TIF proposal. On December 16, 2003, the mayor's office finally asked the Council to establish a nonprofit entity authorized to issue tax-exempt bonds and borrow $1 billion. Under the plan, $460 million of the bond issue would go toward building the convention headquarters hotel. The city said Tishman Realty & Construction, not JBG, would construct the hotel. The remaining bond issue would refinance the convention center's existing debt to take advantage of much lower interest rates. The bundled debt issue, the mayor's office said, made the bond issue more attractive to investors because it was backed by revenues from two entities rather than one. To further ensure that the bonds were accepted by Wall Street, the city agreed to guarantee a portion of bonds' interest with general sales tax revenue in case the hotel TIF did not cover the interest.

== Siting the hotel ==
=== The Mariani controversy ===
The mayor and city council were still negotiating over the TIF deal in March 2004, although both hoped to have legislation passed by May. Even as the Center for Exhibition Industry Research said a headquarters hotel was important for the success of the convention center, there was concern by other hotels in the city that the convention center had not generated enough room nights to justify its construction. The Washington Post business columnist Steven Pearlstein questioned in April 2004 if such a large hotel, questionably financed by the city, was really needed to make the convention center profitable. Pearlstein argued that two 500-room hotels, built solely with private financing, would be adequate.

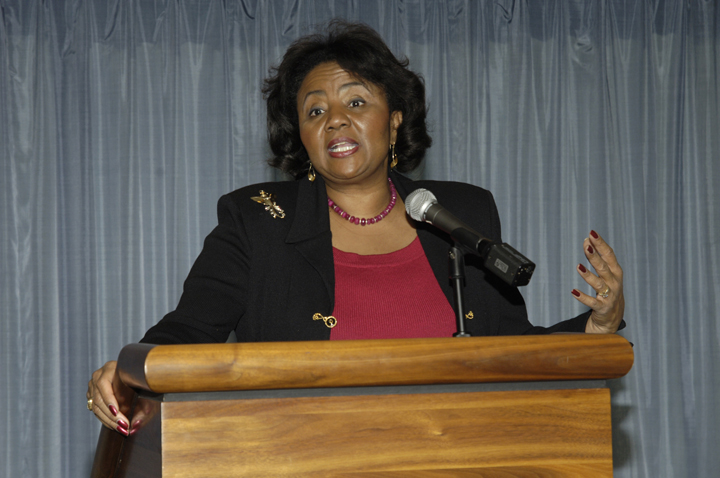
D.C. City Council Chair Linda W. Cropp fought a year-long losing battle to put the convention headquarters hotel on the site of the old convention center.

In April 2004, the D.C. City Council began debating whether the convention headquarters hotel should be built on the site of the old convention center. This proposal originated with local architect Ted Mariani, who proposed constructing a 1,500-room hotel with extensive meeting room space linked by a tunnel to the new convention center. Mariani convinced several members of the City Council that this would be the best use of the land. The Williams administration strongly opposed Mariani's plan. Over the next month, members of the Williams administration and city council staff met to discuss Mariani's proposal. Joe Sternlieb, head of the Downtown D.C. Business Improvement District; James A. Jemison, mayoral planning aide; and city development consultant Ron Kaplan met for two to three hours a day, three times a week, with council staff and offered to agree to a hotel and some meeting space so long as the council approved the deal by late June. But Council Chair Linda W. Cropp and Council Member Jack Evans (in whose ward the site was located) both favored the Mariani plan. On July 15, 2004, the two sides reached an agreement to proceed with the existing Williams plan. However, some city council members and WCSA opposed the agreement. Going a step further, WCSA commissioned a study of the old convention center site from the consulting firm Conventions, Sports & Leisure International (CSIL). WCSA said the report would be ready in August 2004.

=== The WCSA report ===
The CSIL report was complete in October 2004. The authority was to vote to accept the consultant's report on October 13, 2004, but delayed the vote after Mayor Williams asked for more time to negotiate a solution. The next day, Cropp, supported by the city's hospitality industry, again suggested that the old convention center site be used for a $450 million, 1,500-room convention headquarters hotel. With the two sides seemingly deadlocked, Greg Fazakerley, a local developer and former president of the D.C. Building Industry Association, stepped in at the end of October to assist the two sides in coming to an agreement. WCSA then scheduled a vote on the consultant's report for November 4.

WCSA again delayed its vote until December, but released CSIL's report on November 4 under pressure from the other parties in the dispute. The report analyzed six sites for the potential convention headquarters hotel as well as financing options. On December 3, the WCSA board voted in favor of the Williams site, but said it would continue to study placing a hotel somewhere on New York Avenue NW. WCSA said a third option would be to build the hotel on the northeast corner of the old convention center site. Cropp was unhappy with WCSA's action, and the city council continued to defer action on the TIF plan.

=== Resolution on the siting issue ===
Resolution to the dispute came in June 2005, after more than a year delay. By April 2005, a majority of the city council had come to support the Williams proposal, and the council planned to approve the Williams plan on May 4. But Cropp convinced the council to put off the vote, arguing that the bill still gave the mayor absolute discretion over where to build a convention headquarters hotel. Williams submitted a revised agreement on May 24, and the council unanimously approved a plan to redevelop the old convention center site on June 6, 2005. The agreement said that 120,000 square feet (11,000 m^{2}) of land on the northeast corner of the old convention center site would remain undeveloped pending council resolution of what to do with the property. Under the plan, the council also retained authority to change the site of the convention headquarters hotel at any time.

== Obtaining more land ==
=== Purchase of the Pipefitters building ===
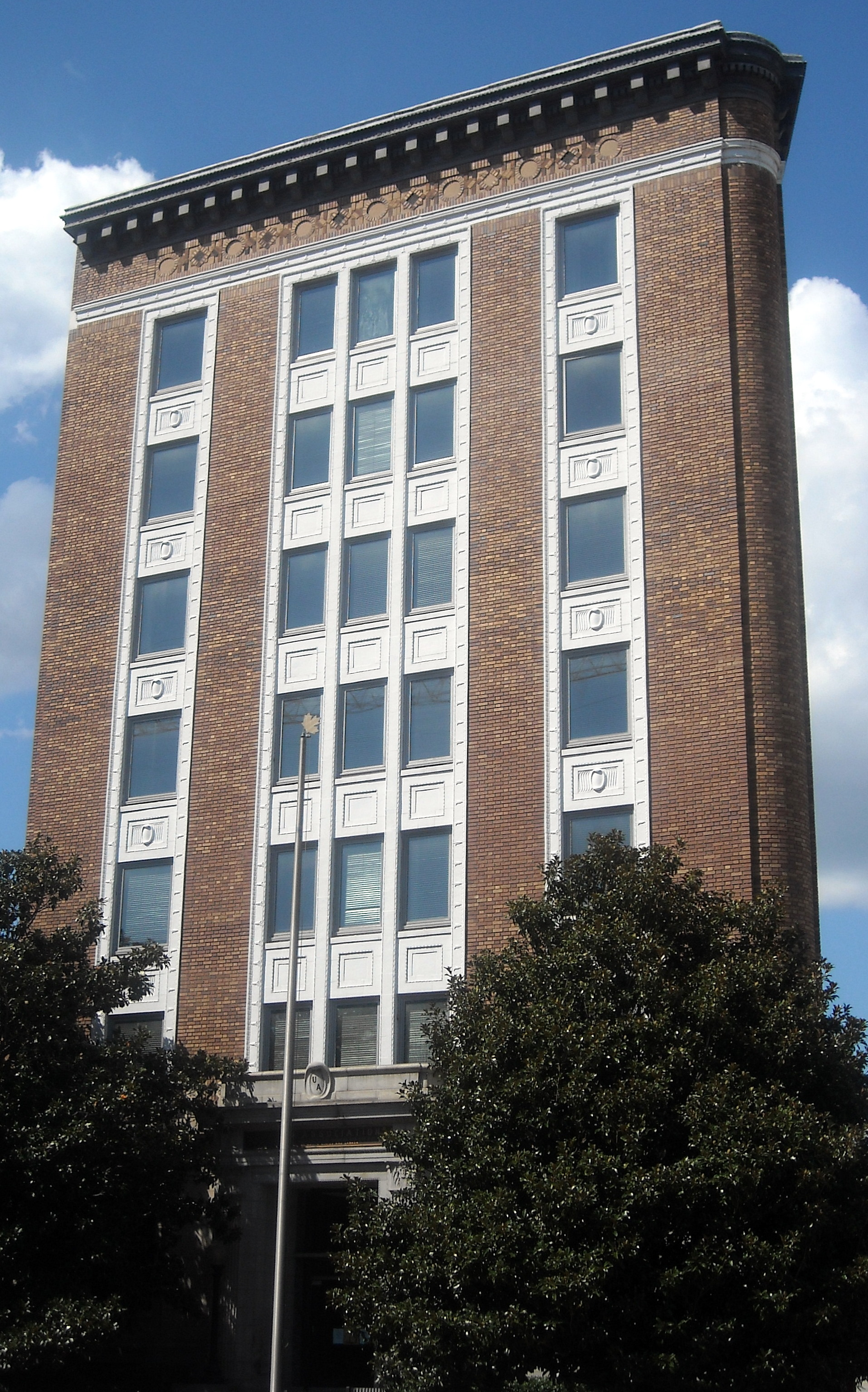
The Pipefitters headquarters, whose purchase by WCSA in August 2005 helped prevent another developer from owning land on the preferred site

Further complicating matters was a $30 million bid in August 2005 by Philadelphia-based real estate development company Lubert-Adler Management to purchase a 0.5-acre (2,000 m^{2}) parcel of land on the corner of 9th Street NW and Massachusetts Avenue NW. This land was owned by a trade union, the United Association of Journeymen and Apprentices of the Plumbing and Pipe Fitting Industry (the Pipefitters), and the union's American Federation of Labor Building, its historic, 90-year-old headquarters occupied the site. Marriott, Gould, and the city hoped to convince the Pipefitters to sell their building for the hotel development. To prevent the Lubert-Adler purchase, WCSA placed a $900,000 deposit on the Pipefitters' property, and pledged that the historic building would be incorporated into the new hotel rather than demolished. On August 22, the Pipefitters agreed to sell their 145,000-square-foot (13,500 m^{2}) parcel to WCSA for $30 million. This sale significantly strengthened the appeal of the Williams-preferred site.

The convention headquarters hotel proposal received a major boost on September 11, 2005, when a second report by CSIL concluded that a $417 million, 1,200-room hotel with 100,000 square feet (9,300 m^{2}) of meeting space and 600 parking spaces would be financially viable. CSIL said that a hotel constructed on the old convention center site would take 12 to 15 months longer to build and cost $12 million more. The report appeared to quash any further attempt to build on the old convention site.

=== The Gould land swap ===
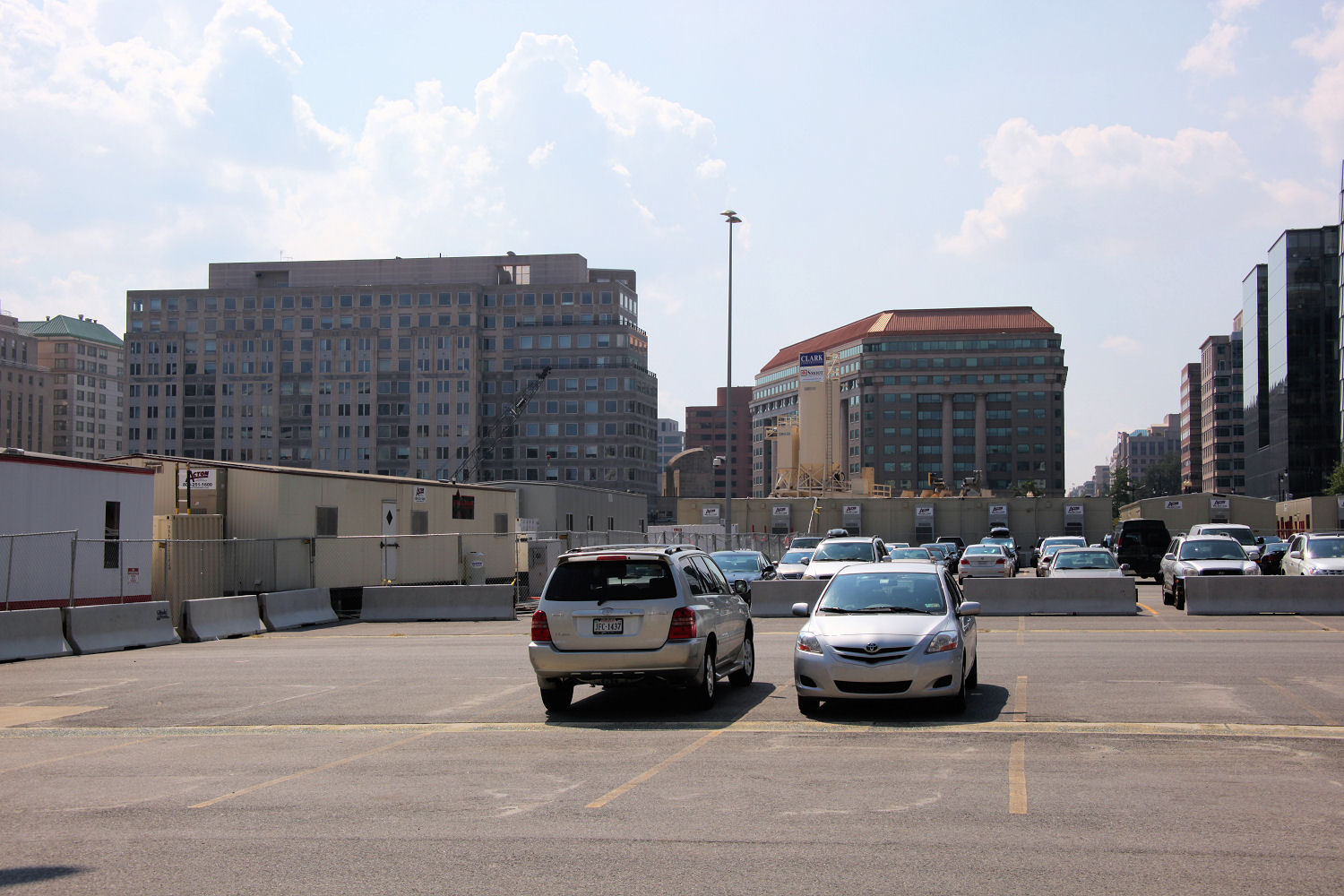
The lot on the northeast corner of the old convention center, which Kingdon Gould III finally obtained in a land swap in November 2007

After council approval for Williams site, the city and Kingdon Gould III became locked in negotiations over Gould's land which would take nearly two years to resolve. The reason for the negotiations is not clear. Gould joined the original proposal by Marriott to build the hotel, and seemed willing to use his land for it. But at some point between October 2002 and January 2006, it became clear that private financing for the convention headquarters hotel could not be obtained with so many property owners. Gould was the smallest property holder and was not providing equity for the project, which led to negotiations to obtain his land.

Initially, the city and Gould discussed two options: buying Gould's land outright, or permitting Gould to swap his land for city-owned land elsewhere. The two sides settled on a land swap, but negotiations stalled after Gould argued that his parcel (valued at $72.6 million) was more valuable than the city-owned parcel on the northeast corner of the old convention center site (valued at $75.9 million). Furthermore, Gould wanted zoning changes made to the old convention center site. City zoning laws required that 200 units of housing be built on the site. Gould wanted guarantees that he would receive a waiver for this regulation.

On January 26, 2006, Gould agreed to swap a 1.5-acre (0.61 ha) lot on the southeast corner of 9th Street NW and Massachusetts Avenue NW for a similar-sized city-owned lot at the site of the former convention center. The deal required city council approval, however. The agreement also said, in part, that the city would seek changes to restrictive zoning regulations on the old convention center site. Local zoning regulations required that 200 units of housing by built on the old convention site. The letter of intent signed by the two sides also made one of Gould's companies, PMI Parking, one of the largest parking lot and parking garage companies in the D.C. metro area, the manager of a parking garage at the new convention headquarters hotel and included late fee payments if the city did not act quickly to finalized the swap. Since the site preferred by Williams was not large enough for the planned hotel and the city-owned lots in the area not contiguous, Gould's land swap created a more unified site with fewer owners.

By February 2007, the land swap agreement still had not been finalized. The zoning changes had not occurred, although city officials pledged they were coming. No agreement over parking garage management had been signed, either. The city declined to get involved in operation of the hotel, and advised Gould to negotiate with Marriott about parking garage management. The long negotiations triggered the late-fee clause that required the city to pay Gould $2.2 million. This, too, delayed the swap, since payment of fees greater than $1 million required city council approval. In September, Gould and the city public accused each other of stalling the deal.

The Gould land swap deal was finally approved by the city council on November 1, 2007. It had taken 22 months to change local zoning regulations so Gould was exempted from building housing on the new site.

=== Miscellaneous other land parcels ===
The city had trouble obtaining title to other pieces of the hotel site as well. Two small parcels on 9th and L Streets NW still remained in their owners' hands in early 2007. Although the city could have used its eminent domain powers (approved in June 2006), it instead engaged in negotiations over the price of the land. These negotiations took nearly two years. It was not until December 2006 that the city used its eminent domain powers to secure the land.

== First financing package ==
With council approval of the siting plan complete in June 2005, the council came under pressure to approve the financing package for the convention headquarters hotel. But with little movement on the issue, Marriott and RLJ Development, the development fund owned by billionaire cable executive hedge fund owner Robert L. Johnson, said on September 11, 2005, that they were working on a plan to privately finance the hotel and avoid the city council altogether. But no private financing fell into place, either.

In February 2006, Mayor Williams resubmitted to the city council his three-year-old proposal for public financing the convention headquarters hotel. With the likely cost of the hotel now at $650 million, Williams asked the city to sell $187 million in TIF bonds to WCSA, which in turn would sell WCSA bonds based on its own revenues as well as those of the TIF. WCSA would use its own bond sales to pay $187 million of the hotel's construction costs, with the remainder to be privately financed by Marriott and RLJ Development. The Williams proposal also leased the publicly owned land to Marriott and its partners for 99 years at a cost of $37 million. The deal permitted Marriott to build a 1,434-room hotel with 100,000 square feet (9,300 m^{2}) of meeting space and 600 parking spaces. Additionally, Marriott would permit WCSA to build a 50,000-square-foot (4,600 m^{2}) meeting center on the site. (WCSA said it would finance this center separately from the WCSA bond sale.) Although city chief financial officer Natwar Gandhi doubted the hotel would generate enough tax revenue to meet TIF needs, Marriott consultant MuniCap estimated the hotel would generate $44.2 million in tax revenue three years after its completion. To ensure that construction began by 2008, the legislation also contained eminent domain language allowing the city to obtain title to two small properties within the parcel which it had not yet acquired.

Approval of this financing package was relatively swift. In June 2006, the council passed the Williams proposal. Only $135 million in TIF bonds were approved, but the eminent domain provisions were included as submitted.

In November 2006, Adrian Fenty was elected mayor of Washington, D.C., after Anthony Williams declined to seek a third term in office. Fenty was sworn into office in January 2007.

== Second financing package and construction agreement ==
=== Financial viability and financing concerns ===
Concerns about the viability of the convention center headquarters hotel occurred again in 2007. Convention hotel room bookings in Washington, D.C., fell 13% in 2006 and were estimated to fall another 24% in 2007 and 29% in 2008, bringing into question the need for a headquarters hotel. In Baltimore, Maryland, a convention center headquarters hotel approved in 2006 failed to boost convention bookings. Furthermore, Gaylord Entertainment Company was constructing a 2,000-room hotel and meeting complex at its Gaylord National Resort & Convention Center in Prince George's County, Maryland, just across the city line. The Gaylord complex, the Washington Post said, was likely to draw business away from the proposed D.C. convention headquarters hotel. Reviewing these developments, Heywood Sanders, a professor of public administration at the University of Texas at San Antonio concluded that "Putting in a hotel is no guarantee that it will improve the [Walter E. Washington Convention Center's] performance." But others defended the need for a convention headquarters hotel. Convention center officials and William Hanbury, president and chief executive officer of Washington Convention & Tourism Corp. (a nonprofit group promoting conventions and tourism in the city), blamed the bookings drop on the lack of a headquarters hotel. Hanbury estimated the loss of convention business at $200 million. Additionally, the Washington Post reported that hotel occupancy in the city was still so high that few hotels were willing to give conventions the significant rate discounts they usually received. This, too, was hurting convention center bookings.

Other issues threatened to raise the cost of the hotel and put its viability in question as well. A new sticking point was how many rooms the hotel would have to set aside each night for convention business. Marriott and its finance partners wanted fewer rooms dedicated to convention business so that its operating margins would be higher. Marriott also wanted to build multiple mid-size meeting rooms rather a few large ballrooms. No agreement had been reached on these issues by February 2007, despite several months of negotiations. However, the two sides did agree that the underground portion of the hotel would include a 75,000-square-foot (7,000 m^{2}) meeting center that would include at least one ballroom and multiple meeting rooms. The long negotiations were, according to RLJ Development executives, leading to higher costs and could lead Marriott and its partners to ask for more public money. The negotiations did not seem to impede construction, however. Construction on the hotel was scheduled to begin in early 2010 in time for a late 2011 opening.

Despite questions about the need for the hotel, private financing fell into place by February 2007. Marriott and RLJ Development announced that Quadrangle Development Corporation was joining the project as a financing partner for the hotel, whose cost had fallen to $550 million. Even though the city had not issued any approval for alley closures, historic building preservation, excavations down to 80 feet (24 m) below ground, or zoning changes, the addition of private equity investment in the hotel was considered a positive sign.

=== Request for more public funds ===
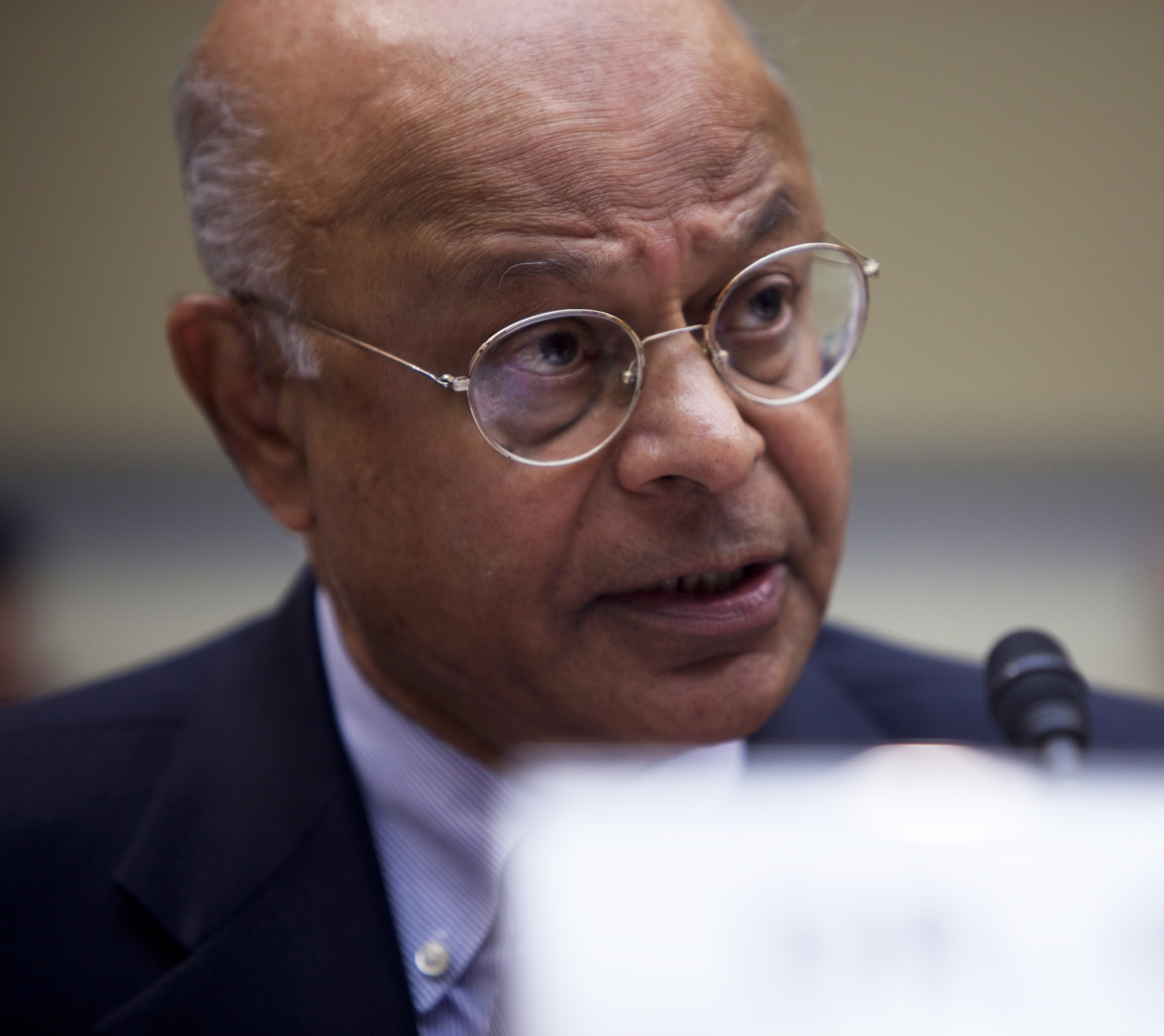
D.C. Chief Financial Officer Natwar Gandhi warned that public funding for the hotel would breach the city's debt cap. He later helped negotiate the final financing package.

Not only did existing finance deals fall apart in 2008, but costs on the project rose. As the developers asked for additional public financing, the city's debt cap began to play a role in negotiations.

In February 2007, RLJ Development officials warned that the excessive delay in approving the project was leading to higher costs, and might lead Marriott and its partners to seek additional public funding. City CFO Natwar Gandhi warned in June 2007 that the project risked breaching the city's voluntary debt cap of 12% of total expenditures. Washington, D.C., had a legal debt limit of 17% of expenditures. To improve the city's dismal bond rating and low interest payments, the city adopted a voluntary debt cap of 12%.

Marriott asked for additional public financing in early September 2007. The cost of the facility had risen to $750 million, and a worsening economic climate made less credit available. Marriott and RLJ Development said that, without additional public funds, they would not turn a profit on the hotel. In response, council member Jack Evans (long a supporter of the hotel) suggested that the city cancel the project.

A side-issue involved construction of the 50,000-square-foot (4,600 m^{2}) meeting center, agreed to in February 2006. At that time, Marriott agreed to let the city build this meeting center on part of Marriott-owned land just north of the convention headquarters hotel site. Marriott would build zoning-required housing on the rest of the land. But Marriott changed its mind, and asked the city to buy the parcel for $50 million. The city declined to do so, which put the February 2006 construction agreement in jeopardy. Even if the city did purchase the land, Marriott would be forced to lease it back for the convention headquarters hotel. The city said it would do so for $5 million a year, but Marriott balked and offered to pay $500,000 to $600,000 a year.

=== Final construction agreement ===
To save the project, Marriott agreed to scale back the size of the hotel. Shortly after the request for more public funding, District asked Marriott to cut the cost of the facility by reducing the number of rooms to about 1,000. Marriott agreed to build only 1,150 rooms, and to scrap the underground ballroom and meeting space (saving an estimated $100 million). Marriott and the city also resolved their dispute over the room set-aside for convention business. This issue had been coming to a conclusion since early 2007, when Mayor Fenty gave Marriott a take-it-or-leave-it offer to reserve 80% of the rooms for the convention center, so long as convention center business was booked three years in advance. Marriott agreed to the 80% set-aside in September.

The concessions by Marriott worked. On September 24, 2007, Marriott, WCSA, and the city signed an agreement to jointly finance the 1,150-room hotel.

== Design work ==
Marriott released details about the hotel's ongoing design effort in October 2008, more than a year after the structure's specifications had been agreed to by the city. The company said the convention headquarters hotel would break ground in 2009 and open in 2012. Marriott planned for the hotel to have six restaurants, five at street-level. These first floor restaurants would include a traditional restaurant, a "concept" restaurant, a cafe, a sports bar, and an upscale liquor bar. Marriott submitted its plans to the D.C. zoning commission for approval in November 2008.

The Marriott Marquis' design was submitted to the National Capital Planning Commission in late 2008. The designs outlined a 14-story, 1-million-square-foot (93,000 m^{2}) hotel with a glass and steel facade. The facade of the historic 1916 Pipefitters building would be incorporated into the facade. The design required digging 100 feet (30 m) below ground to build 1,000 parking spaces and two levels of usable space to accommodate 100,000 square feet (9,300 m^{2}) of ballroom and meeting room space (which had been restored to the project). The plans also called for a tunnel beneath 9th Street NW to link the hotel and the convention center. The commission, which had approval authority over the development, reported favorably on February 4. The same month, WCSA announced the underwriters for its forthcoming $187 million bond issue (of which $134 million would go toward the hotel).

== Third financing agreement ==
=== Collapse of private financing ===
As the recession deepened and the debt crisis worsened, the hotel's developers pleaded for yet more public funding. But in July 2008, city CFO Gandhi repeated his warning from June 2007 that the city would breach its debt cap by doing so. The city had already committed to public funding to redevelop the Southwest waterfront, the O Street Market mixed-use project, and the purchase of Skyland Shopping Center, and Gandhi warned that funding might need to be diverted from these and other projects or the city would be left with just $122 million to spend on development and infrastructure between 2008 and 2014. Marriott tried to calm the city's fears by saying it had not yet approached the capital markets to seek private financing, and would not do so until at least April 2009.

Private financing for the hotel collapsed in June 2009. RLJ Development dropped out of the project some time between September 2007 and June 2009, but Marriott added Capstone Development led by a former Marriott executive, as a new financing partner. However, Marriott, Capstone, and Quadrangle Development were unable to find the funds needed to begin construction. In an attempt to rescue the project, on May 29, WCSA authorized the sale of $750 million in bonds to pay for the hotel. To issue these bonds, WCSA needed city council approval. But with the city facing an $800 million budget deficit in fiscal 2010 and a $1 billion deficit in 2011, such approval seemed unlikely.

The city council began considering in June 2009 whether an additional $100 million in city financing might convince lenders or investors to join the project. On June 7, Capstone said it had $135 million in equity dollars in place, but needed $300 million in lending for that equity to be committed. In mid June, the city council considered transferring funding away from seven other city-backed development projects to fund the hotel, since the council refused to violate the city's debt cap. But several unnamed city council members were unwilling for the city to take a greater equity interest in the hotel after spending $700 million on constructing the new Nationals Park in March 2006.

=== Third financing package ===
On June 17, 2009, the city council and WCSA came to an agreement on a new financing plan crafted by city CFO Natwar Gandhi. Under the plan, the city would loan Marriott $80 million in return for Marriott, Capstone, and Quadrangle raising their equity contribution to $320 million from $135 million. To obtain the additional equity money, ING Clarion Real Estate Investment was added as a new partner in the project. The higher equity participation meant that Marriott would no longer need to seek private lending as part of the agreement—which meant construction could go forward without the long delay that would occur while seeking bank loans. The city's total contribution would be $267 million ($135 million in equity financing, $80 million in loans, and $52 million in WCSA bond refinancing), all to be raised by a joint city-WCSA bond issue.

The D.C. City Council voted unanimously on June 29, 2009, in favor of the new financing package. The deal was revised somewhat from the June 17 agreement. The city agreed to issue $225 million in bonds (down from $267 million) in order to give Marriott $159 million in equity financing (an increase from $135 million). TIF revenues from the hotel project itself would pay for $135 million in equity financing, while the other $24 million in equity money would come from other TIF revenue sources in the city. WCSA would contribute a $25 million loan (payable over 25 years) as well as a one-time $22 million grant to build the hotel. The city also agreed to eliminate the requirement that a parking garage be built near the hotel.

The June 29 financing deal passed a second and final vote by the council on July 14, 2009. A $2 million training program (to be paid for by the bond issue) was added to the city's bond issue. The money raised paid the construction contractor to train unemployed city workers in various skilled construction jobs while the hotel was built. Marriott officials said that, with the financing finally in place, groundbreaking would occur in late 2010 and the hotel to open 42 months later.

== JBG lawsuit ==
=== Initiation of the lawsuit ===
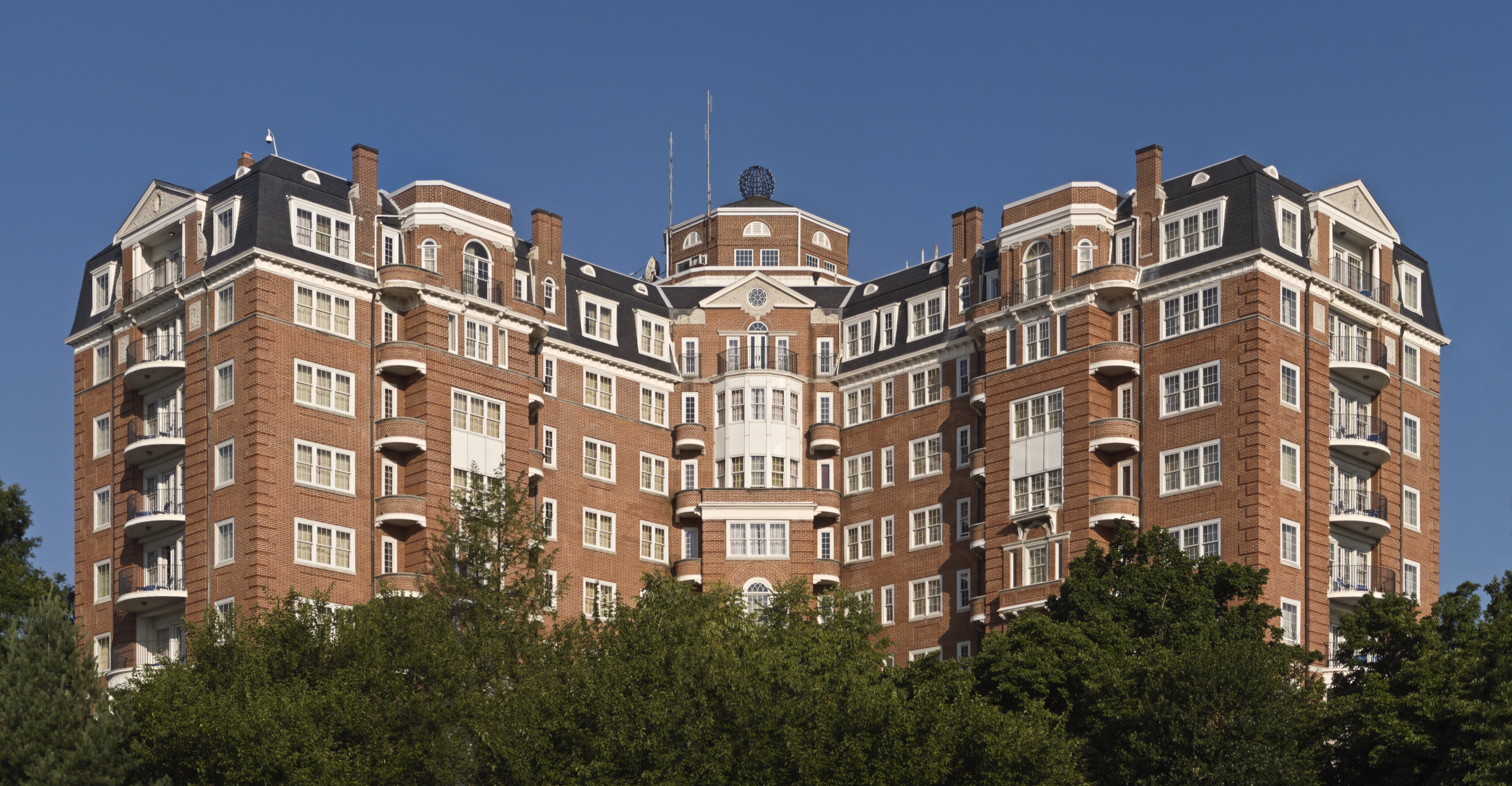
JBG Smith allegedly sued to stop the Washington Marriott Marquis project in order to obtain favorable action by Marriott on condo conversions at the Marriott Wardman Park (pictured).

A subsidiary of JBG Smith, Wardman Investor LLC, filed a notice with the city's Contract Appeals Board in early 2009 to have the entire project set aside for being an "invalid sole source procurement". JBG argued that the original proposal required the hotel to be built on private land and financed with private money. JBG did not submit a proposal because it could not meet these conditions. Subsequently, the city negotiated only with Marriott, eliminated the private investment requirement, added $272 million in public financing, and gave Marriott an "extraordinarily favorable" lease. JBG argued that these changes so altered the terms of the project that it should be put out for public bid again. The appeals board said in July 2009 that JBG lacked standing to protest the award since it never bid on the job. Even if the company did have standing, the appeals board said, it lost the right to protest after the council passed legislation removing the project from the regular contracting process in 2006.

JBG's motive for filing the lawsuit may not have been to contest the construction of the convention headquarters hotel, however. The lawsuit may have been prompted by a dispute between JBG and Marriott blocking the conversion of a portion of the Marriott Wardman Park, which JBG and CIM Group purchased from Thayer Lodging in 2005, into condominiums.

Construction of the Marriott Marquis was placed on hold on September 4, 2009.

The lawsuit continued through the fall of 2009 and into 2010. The D.C. Attorney General asked the court to dismiss the suit on October 11, but the court declined to do so on November 18. The city asked for a reconsideration of its motion on December 1, but the court declined to do so on January 6, 2010.

=== Counter-suits ===
Marriott counter-sued JBG on January 14, 2010, accusing JBG of tortious interference in its contractual relations. In support of its claim, Marriott told the court that JBG Cos. officials had threatened Marriott with a convention center lawsuit if it did not renegotiate its Wardman Park deal. The lawsuit significantly delayed financing of the project. No bonds were issued by mid-January 2010, and there were signs that ING Clarion might back out of the project if additional delays occurred. In an attempt to break the deadlock, Council member Jack Evans (a former real estate attorney) tried to mediate the dispute. On January 21, WCSA filed suit against JBG Cos. for tortious interference as well. The city followed suit with yet another tortious interference claim on February 18.

On March 29, 2010, D.C. Superior Court Judge Natalia Combs Greene granted partial summary judgment and a motion to dismiss to Marriott, the city, and WCSA. A partial out-of-court settlement had already been reached by the parties giving JBG Cos. some limited ability to move forward on the condo project, but that agreement now seemed unnecessary given the court's ruling. Public officials were pleased with the court's ruling, and believed the convention headquarters project would move ahead quickly. The amended order can be viewed here. City officials said groundbreaking on the hotel would occur in May or June 2010, and WCSA officials said the construction bonds could brought to the market within 60 to 75 days.

=== Resolution of the lawsuits ===
But by June 2010 there was still no agreement over the JBG Cos. lawsuit. All parties had suspended litigation against one another three weeks prior to the district court's decision to give negotiations a chance. But JBG could still appeal the district court's ruling, which brought a halt to talks. With no resolution in sight, the city said on June 3 that it would resume litigation in two days if an agreement was not forthcoming. No resolution was reached, and litigation resumed on June 8.

The parties in the various lawsuits resolved their legal dispute on July 1, 2010. The agreement permitted construction to go ahead on the convention headquarters hotel, but otherwise terms were not disclosed. The agreement precluded a legal appeal by all parties.

The legal dispute had delayed construction on the convention headquarters hotel by another nine months. To get the project restarted, WCSA said it would release its $22 million grant to Marriott and its partners by the end of August 2010 so that ground preparation could begin immediately.

== Construction of the hotel ==
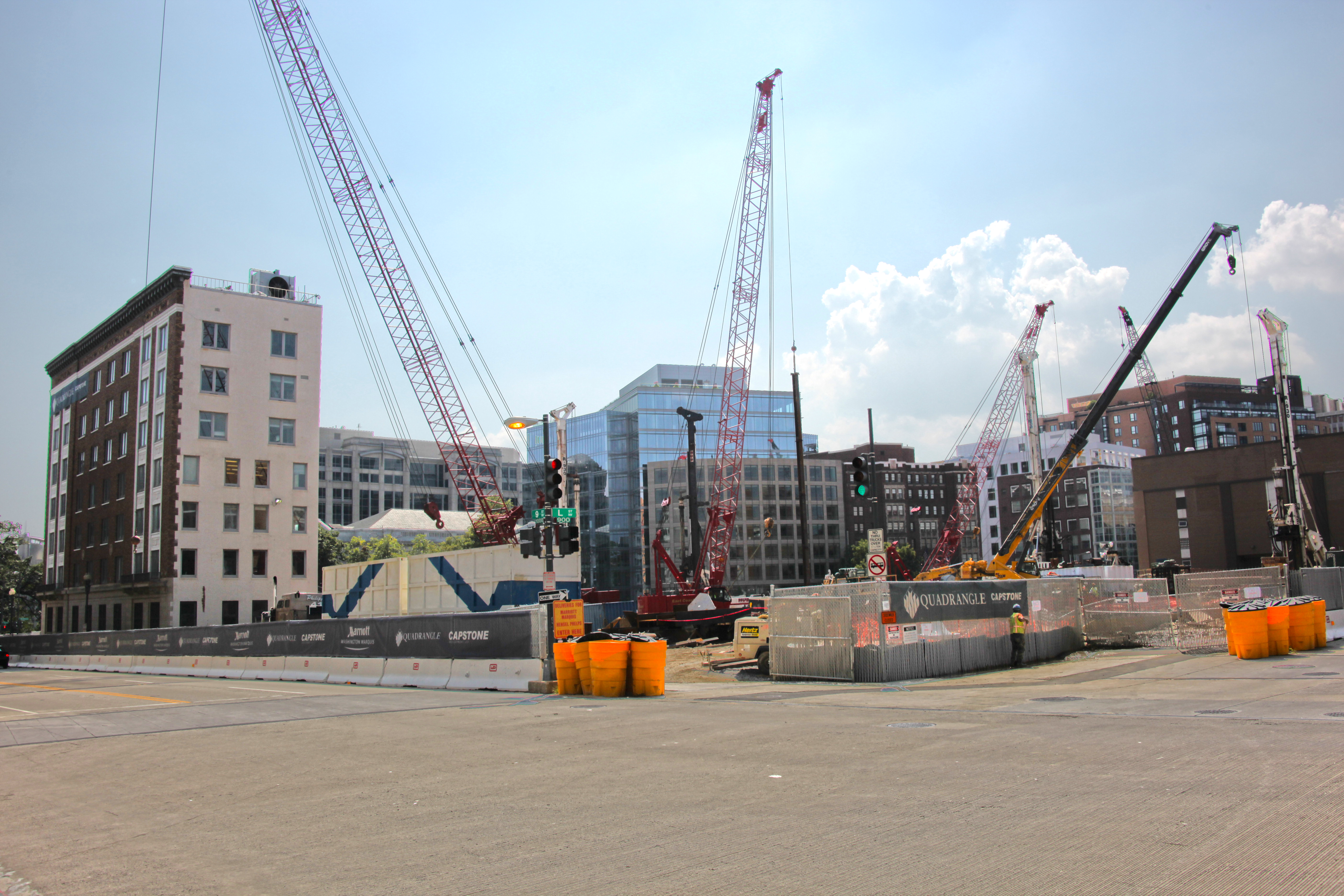
Construction continues on the Marriott Marquis Washington, DC in August 2011.

WCSA's bonds reached the market in November 2010. The bond issues included $66.5 million of tax-exempt Build America Bonds (BAB) recovery zone facility bonds, $90 million of taxable BAB recovery zone economic development bonds, and $20.1 million of BAB direct payment bonds—all of which went to fund the convention headquarters hotel. Another $71.8 million of taxable bonds refinanced existing WCSA debt.

Ground was broken for Marriott Marquis Washington, DC on November 10, 2010. Officials announced that the four-star hotel would open in the spring of 2014. Construction was expected to take a full year longer than usual due to the deep excavation needed for the underground levels and the connecting tunnel with the convention center. The cost of the structure was estimated at $520 million.

The business climate for the Marriott Marquis Washington, DC improved dramatically after ground was broken. On May 3, 2011, the hotel received its first convention-related business when the Association of the United States Army agreed to take space in the hotel for 2014, 2015, and 2016. By August 2012, the hotel secured 15 contracts for about 210,000 room nights through 2021. In September 2011, Marriott announced it and Capstone Development would build a Courtyard by Marriott and a Residence Inn by Marriott on Marriott-owned land north of the Marriott Marquis. Together, the hotels would provide 500 rooms. Marriott asked for $35 million in TIF funds from the city for the $172 million project, but the city, which was near its borrowing cap, said it was "not entertaining new TIF applications right now." In June 2012, Marriott signed a $210 million contract to operate four hotels owned by Gaylord Entertainment. The agreement gave Marriott control over the Gaylord Resort Hotel at National Harbor, helping to reduce the competitive impact of that hotel. PKF Hospitality Research reported in July 2012 that demand for hotel rooms in Washington, D.C., was projected to outpace supply through 2016, even with the addition of the Marriott Marquis Washington, DC and other planned and under-construction hotels.

Construction of the hotel began to rise above ground in August 2012, halfway through its construction schedule. Although engineers still had 15 feet (4.6 m) to dig, most of the foundations and below-ground ballroom and meeting room space were complete. Officials said the hotel had to dig a total of 90 feet (27 m) below ground. Construction officials said a platform would be built at grade which would support continuing construction below ground as well as construction above it. Marriott was given permission to place 17 mobile trailers on its unused lots north of the construction site in November 2012. The trailers served as temporary offices for the construction foremen and leaders. A grand opening date of May 1, 2014 was set.

The hotel reported booking the annual meetings of the American Academy of Family Physicians (6,500 total attendees) for October 2014, the Family, Career and Community Leaders of America (5,000 total attendees) for July 2015, and the American Dental Association (40,000 total attendees) for November 2015.

=== Design lawsuit ===
The hotel's general contractor, Hensel Phelps Construction Co., alleged that Cooper Carry, the hotel's architect of record, failed to properly design the structure. Hensel Phelps identified 20 areas of concern, which included below-grade structures, ceiling materials, door hardware, duct work, the gutter and downspout systems for entrance canopies, the smoke control system, stairwells, the tops of walls in guestrooms, windows, and more. Hensel Phelps also claimed that Cooper Carry failed to perform its work in a timely manner, forcing the contractor to miss deadlines, and violated basic "standard of care" obligations. The two parties engaged in mediation, but were unable to come to an agreement. In October 2015, Hensel Phelps filed an $8.5 million lawsuit against Cooper Carry in federal court.

== Hotel opening and operation ==
The hotel opened on May 1, 2014, with a ribbon-cutting ceremony six weeks later. It was the 4,000th hotel for Marriott International, and with 1,175 rooms, the largest hotel in Washington, DC.

=== Exterior/structure ===
The 15-story building includes a 5,200 square-foot outdoor event terrace and seven below-grade levels housing event space, 400 parking spaces, and a tunnel to the Walter E. Washington Convention Center.

The exterior of the Neomodern structure is glass and steel. It also incorporates the facade of the historic former headquarters of the American Federation of Labor Building, a Chicago school brick and limestone building built in 1916.

=== Interior/amenities ===
The hotel features an atrium with a glass skylight, and a 56-foot (17 m)-high lobby sculpture. Roughly 18,000 square feet (1,700 m^{2}) of space on the mezzanine overlooks the atrium. Six hospitality suites exist on the mezzanine level. Other amenities include a concierge level lounge with outdoor patio, and a two-story 8,000-square-foot (740 m^{2}) fitness center. The hotel has 1,175 guest rooms, including 46 suites. Two suites are very large "Presidential suites" and six are medium-sized "Vice Presidential suites."

=== Dining ===
The lobby has a large bar and lounge area, and there are four separate restaurant spaces. At opening, the restaurants were Anthem, The Dignitary, and High Velocity, while the final restaurant space was vacant.

Anthem is a breakfast-and-lunch-only diner accessible from the hotel lobby serving burgers, sandwiches, and shakes inspired by the Hot Shoppes restaurants co-founded by J. Willard Marriott that preceded Marriott Corporation.

The Dignitary is a cocktail lounge housed in the old Pipefitters Union building with a menu focused on whiskey.

High Velocity is a sports bar with 36 flat-screen TVs and a ticker tape scrolling the latest sports scores visible from L Street and 9th Street.

Arroz was a Spanish restaurant that recently closed. Celebrity chef Mike Isabella signed a deal to open a restaurant in the Marquis in 2016. Upon opening, the restaurant received three stars from food critic Tom Sietsema in The Washington Post. The operators of the restaurant filed for bankruptcy in December 2018.

=== Meetings/events ===
Four meeting levels are located underground.

- Meeting Level 1, just below the ground floor, contains small meeting rooms.
- Meeting Level 2 below it contains the Marquis Ballroom, a 30,000 square feet (2,800 m^{2}) room with no columns and 22-foot (6.7 m) high ceilings. The foyer of the ballroom receives natural light from the atrium above. A large delivery area in back permits large exhibits and automobiles to access the ballroom. The Walter E. Washington Convention Center is also accessible from this level via an underground concourse.
- Meeting Level 3 contains additional meeting room space, although these rooms are larger than those on Meeting Level 1.
- Meeting Level 4 contains two ballrooms, the Independence Ballroom and the Liberty Ballroom. Each ballroom has 10,800 square feet (1,000 m^{2}) of column-free space, and 20-foot (6.1 m)-high ceilings. Numerous additional small meeting rooms are also located on this level.

The Marquis has hosted many events, including weddings, charity events, political forums, religious conferences, and an inaugural ball.

=== Employees ===
The Marquis had agreed to hire 51% of its employees from Washington, DC residents, and Marriott partnered with Goodwill of Greater Washington to create a hospitality jobs training program, hiring 178 District residents through the program by opening day. The nearly 900 employees of the Marriott Marquis Washington, DC voted during their orientation, in a card check neutrality election, to join Local 25, UNITE Here which represents hotel workers in the Washington, DC metropolitan area.

== Rating ==
In March 2017, Cvent, an event management company, ranked the Washington Marriott Marquis 72nd in its annual list of the top U.S. hotels for meetings.
