= BBGM =

American architecture and design company

BBGM Architects + Interiors
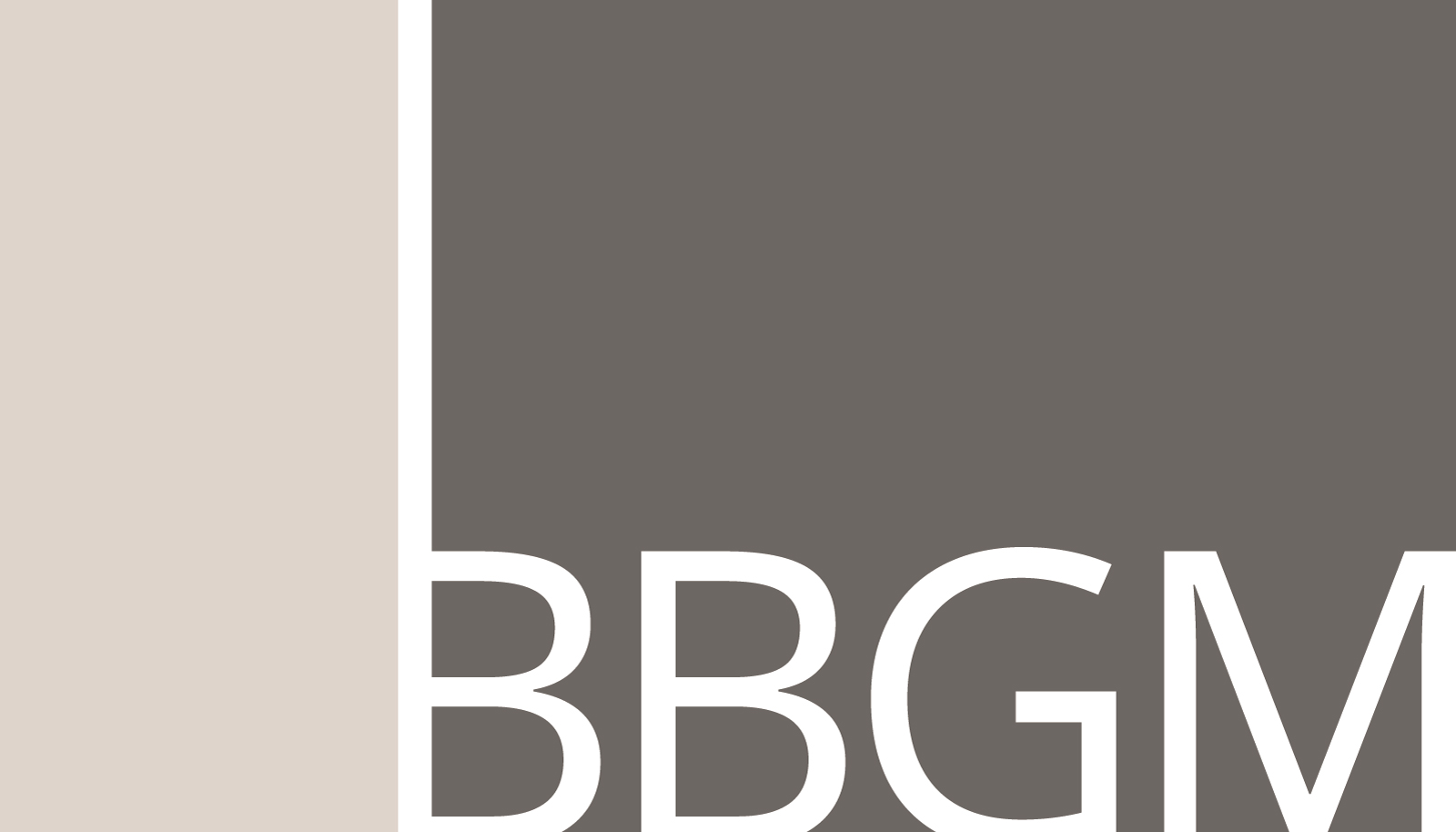
- Type: Private
- Industry: Architecture, Interior Design
- Founded: 1984 (BBG); 1987 (BBGM)
- Founders: David Beer; Henry (Hank) Brennan; Peter Gorman
- Headquarters: Washington, D.C.
- Area served: International
- Key people: Domenic Giordano, AIA; Bruno Grinwis, IIDA; Bahram Kamali, AIA; Kathryn Mickel, IIDA; David Delcher, AIA, LEED AP; Reade Elliott, AIA, LEED AP
- Services: Adaptive Reuse, Architecture, Historic Preservation, Interior Design, Master Planning, Renovation, Restoration, Sustainable Design, Urban Design
- Website: bbgm.com

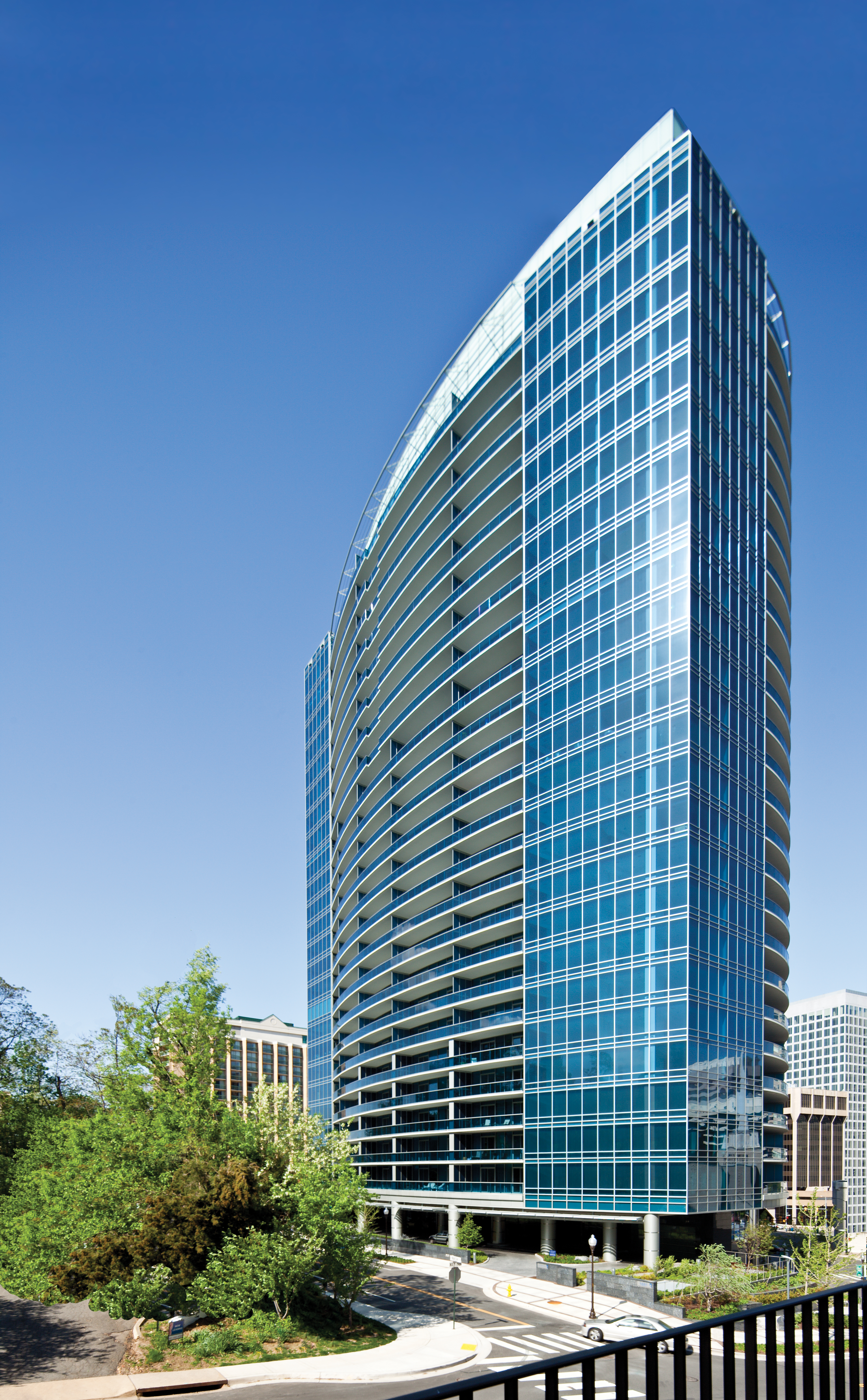
Turnberry Tower

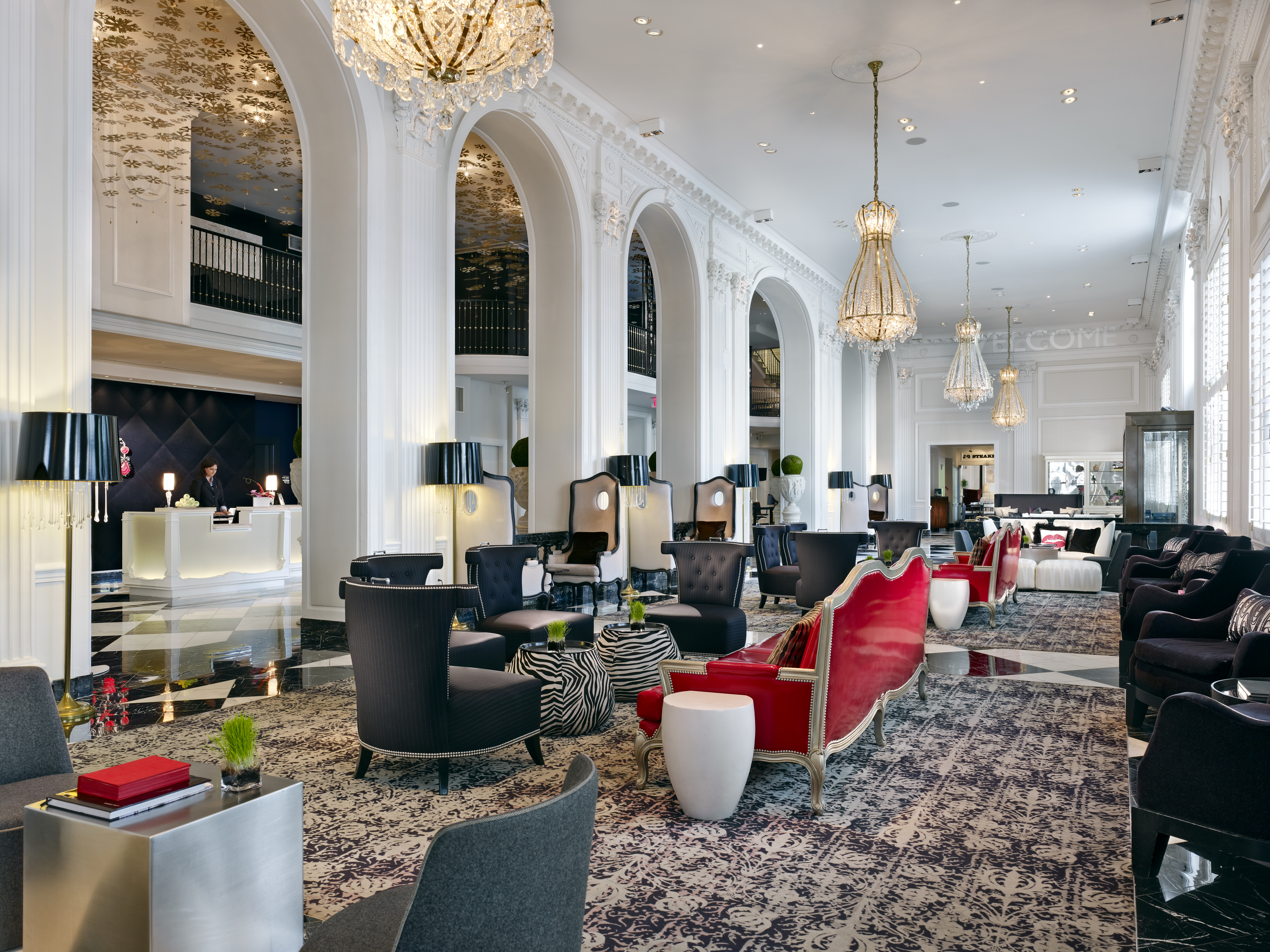
W Hotel D.C.

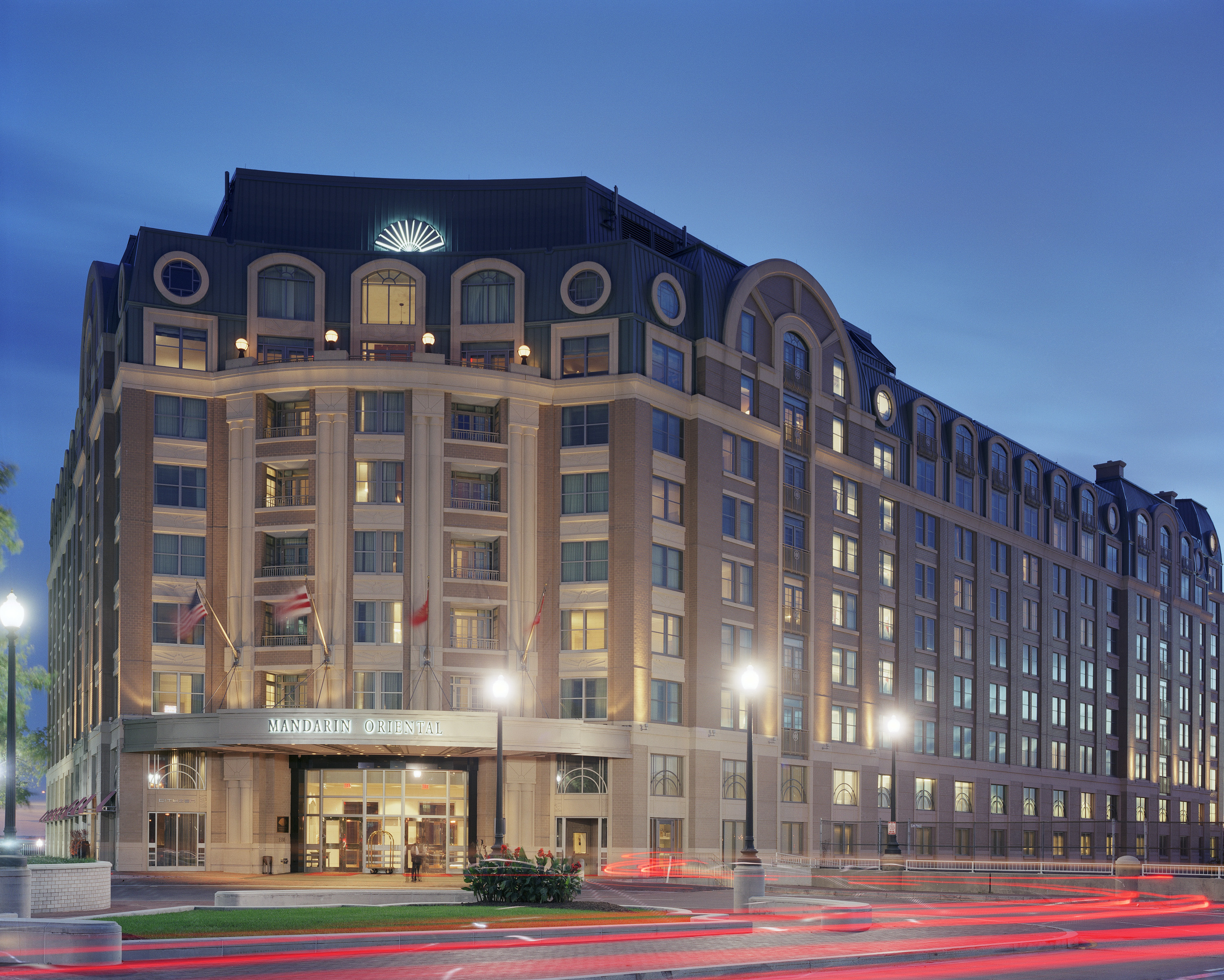
Mandarin Oriental D.C.

BBGM is an American architecture and interior design firm. It is based in Washington, DC, and employs about 50 architects and interior designers. It specializes in the design of hotel, office and large residential buildings.

== History ==
In the 1990s the firm began work on hotel projects, including renovation of the St. Regis Hotel, the Sheraton Center and the Sheraton City Square in New York City, and the Hamilton Crowne Plaza, the Omni Shoreham Hotel, the Hay-Adams Hotel, and the Sofitel Lafayette Square renovations in Washington, D.C. By 2004 the firm had worked on almost forty hotels in the D.C. area.

In 1994, BBGM took part in designing the expansion for The Peninsula Hong Kong, and has also worked on projects in China, the United Arab Emirates, the Caribbean, Egypt, India, Mexico, Singapore, Russia, Australia, South America, Canada, and the United States.

The company's name was simplified to BBGM in 2013.

In 2015, BBGM merged with Arizona-based luxury hotel design firm Monogram.

== Selected projects ==
- Hay-Adams Hotel, Washington, D.C
- Suite 5000 of the Mandarin Oriental, New York, N.Y.
- Mandarin Oriental, Washington, D.C.
- Lotte New York Palace Hotel, New York, N.Y.

- Martin Katz Jewel Suite (designed in collaboration with Martin Katz)
- Dom Pérignon Suite

- Omni Shoreham Hotel, Washington, D.C.
- Plaza Hollywood, Hong Kong
- Rosewood Abu Dhabi, Abu Dhabi, United Arab Emirates
- Sofitel New York Hotel, New York, N.Y.
- Turnberry Tower, Arlington, V.A.
- W Hotel Washington, Washington, D.C.
- Washington Marriott Marquis, Washington, D.C.
- Watergate Hotel, Washington, D.C.
- Wharf Intercontinental, Washington, D.C.
- Willard InterContinental Washington, Washington, D.C.
- Workhouse Arts Center, Lorton, V.A.

== Selected awards and honors ==
- Hotel Business Design

Top Architects and Designers of 2014 (#24)

- Interior Design

Top 10 Fastest Growing Firms of 2014 (#7)
2010 Hospitality Giants (#10)
2009 Hospitality Giants (#9)

- Top 10 Most Impressive Penthouses of 2014

CNBC, Turnberry Tower

- AIA DC 2011 Chapter Design Awards

Merit Award, Lorton Workhouse Arts Center, Historic Resources Category
Merit Award, W Hotel Washington, Historic Resources Category

- 2007 White House Closing the Circle Award,

Pentagon Library & Conference Center, Sustainable Design & Construction at the Pentagon

- Emporis

Emporis Skyscraper Award 2000, Sofitel New York Hotel
