= American Federation of Labor Building =

Building in Washington, D.C.

- U.S. National Register of Historic Places
- U.S. National Historic Landmark
- D.C. Inventory of Historic Sites
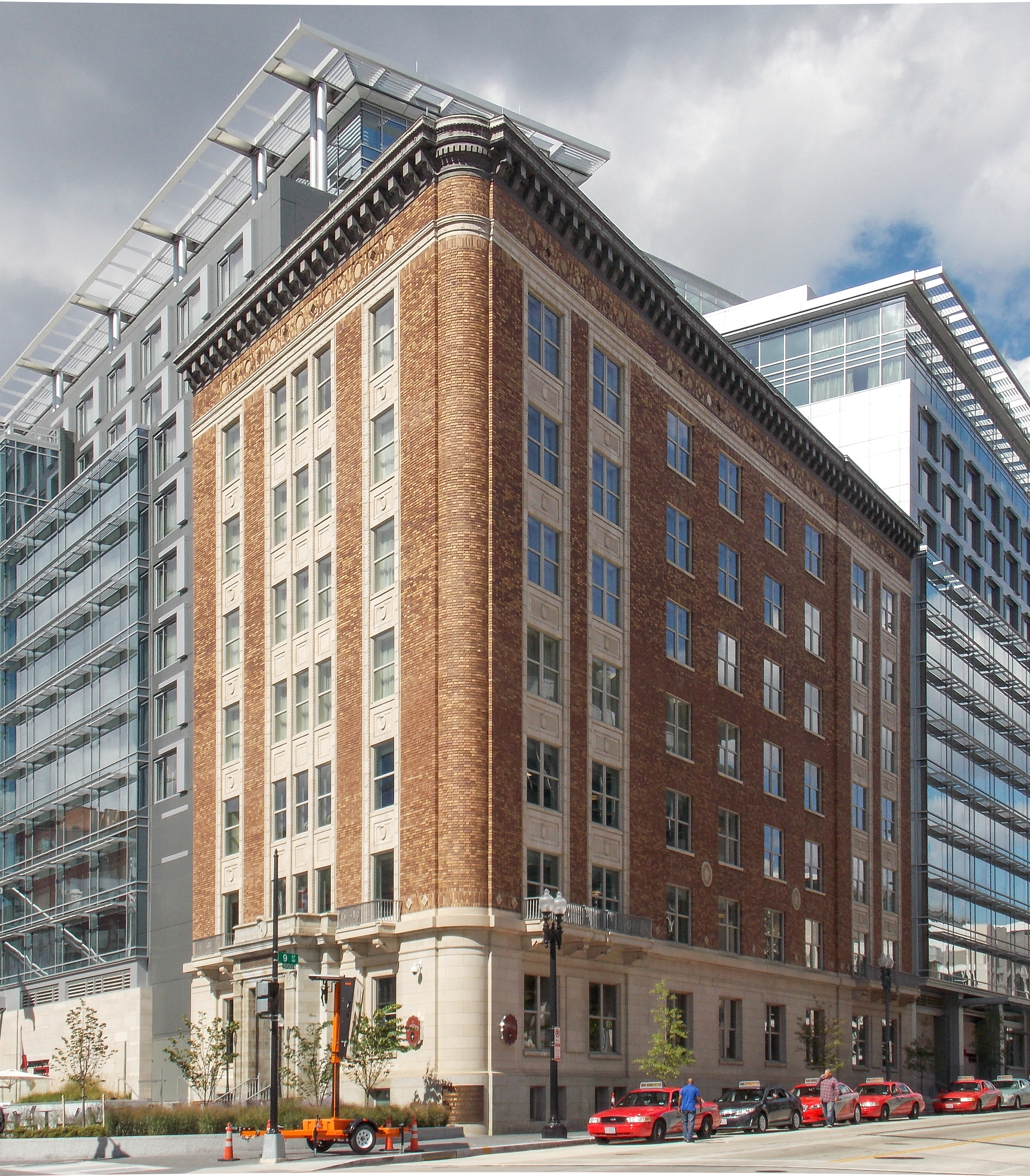
- American Federation of Labor Building in October 2014

- Location within Washington, D.C.
- Location: 901 Massachusetts Avenue, NW., Washington, D.C.
- Coordinates: 38°54′12″N 77°1′28″W
- Built: 1916
- Architect: Milburn, Heister & Company
- Architectural style: Late 19th And Early 20th Century American Movements
- NRHP reference No.: 74002154

Significant dates
- Added to NRHP: September 13, 1974
- Designated NHL: May 30, 1974
- Designated DCIHS: March 3, 1979

The American Federation of Labor Building is a seven-story brick and limestone building located along Massachusetts Avenue in Washington, D.C. Completed in 1916, it served as the headquarters of the American Federation of Labor until 1955, when it merged with the Congress of Industrial Organizations to form the AFL–CIO. It remained a trade union headquarters until 2005, when it was sold to the developers of the Washington Marriott Marquis hotel. The building exterior, the only historical element remaining of the building, is now part of that structure. It was declared a National Historic Landmark in 1974. It housed the American Federation of Labor for 40 years.

== Description and history ==
The facade of the former American Federation of Labor Building forms a corner portion of the Washington Marriott Marquis hotel, set at the northwest corner of Massachusetts Avenue and 9th Street NW. It is seven stories in height, built out of brick with limestone trim. It presents five bays, including its original main entrance, to Massachusetts Avenue, and eight bays to 9th Street. The front facade is characterized by four brick piers, which separate window bays in a 1-3-1 pattern. In between the windows within each group are decorative limestone panels. The building is crowned by a projecting modillioned cornice. The ground floor is faced in limestone.

The building was completed in 1916 to a design by Miburn, Heister & Company for the American Federation of Labor, which was then at a high point in its power and influence. Samuel Gompers, the organization's leader, characterized it as a monument to the power of labor, and its dedication include a speech by President Woodrow Wilson. The AFL continued to occupy the building until 1955, when its merger with the CIO prompted a need for additional office space. The building was then purchased by the Pipefitters Union, which used it as its headquarters. During its ownership the interior was modernized. The union sold the building in 2005 to the developers of the Washington Marriott Marquis, which serves as the main hotel for the Walter E. Washington Convention Center, which is located across the street. The interior spaces of the AFL building now house a lounge space, the hotel's fitness center, and four high-end suites.

== See also ==
- List of National Historic Landmarks in Washington, D.C.
- National Register of Historic Places listings in central Washington, D.C.
