= HelloWallet =

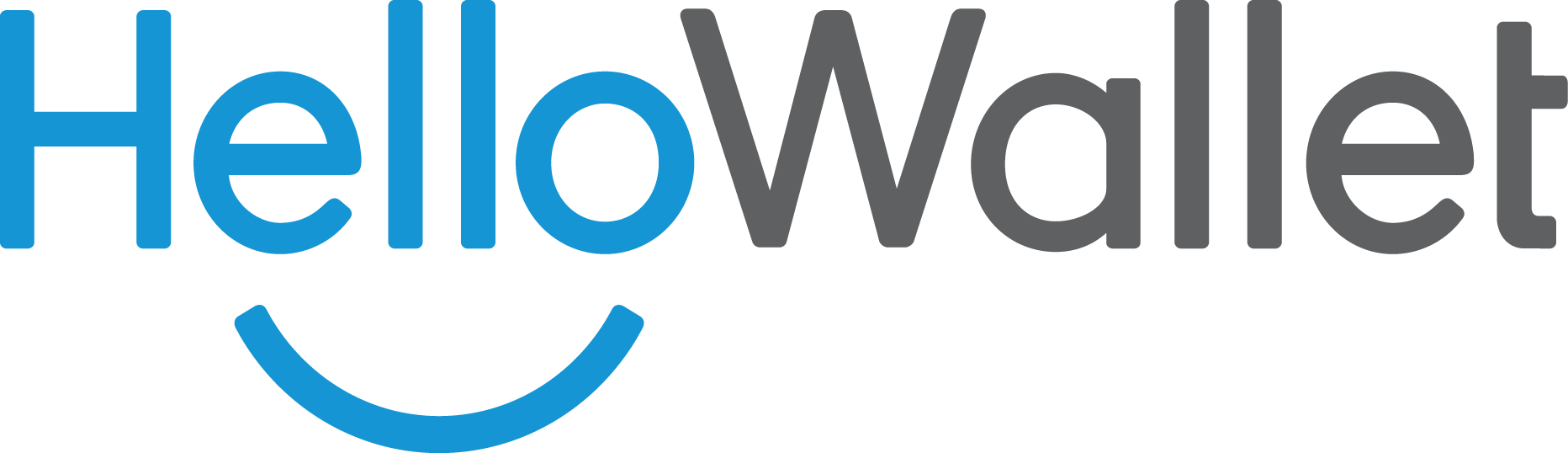
- Type: Private
- Industry: Software, Personal finance
- Founded: 2009
- Founder: Matt Fellowes
- Headquarters: Washington, DC
- Area served: United States
- Number of employees: 60
- Website: http://www.hellowallet.com/

HelloWallet is an online and mobile application for employees founded by former Brookings Institution scholar Matt Fellowes and based in Washington, DC. It provides personalized financial guidance to members and relies on behavioral economics to strive workers to implement its advice.

In May 2017, KeyBank acquired HelloWallet from Morningstar, Inc.

== Business model ==
HelloWallet is primarily distributed through employers as a workplace benefit. In January 2014, HelloWallet partnered with The Vanguard Group to provide guidance on managing debt, managing money, and heightening company benefits to Vanguard's plan participants. Members track their spending, create goals, and receive guidance on saving for emergencies, retirement, and health expenses within the application.

HelloWallet has a double bottom line mission: for every five memberships sold, the company gives one free subscription to an impoverished family through a partnership with a community organization. The company's largest philanthropic partners are Goodwill and Iraq and Afghanistan Veterans of America.

HelloWallet relies on behavioral economics and a group of academic advisors from Dartmouth College, the RAND Corporation, George Washington University, Stanford University, University of Wisconsin–Madison, and the Brookings Institution. In 2013, O'Reilly Media published the first book from HelloWallet Principal Scientist, Dr. Steve Wendel. In the book, Designing for Behavior Change, Dr. Wendel introduces the building blocks for how individuals can design, build, and test products that change behavior.

== Funding ==
The company was created with support from the Rockefeller Foundation in 2009. In 2010, it raised additional funds from AOL founder Steve Case, Jean Case, Grotech Ventures, and a group of private individuals.

In January 2012, HelloWallet received $12 million in Series B funding, led by Chicago-based Morningstar, Inc. and DC-based TD Fund.
