= Logik (e-discovery company) =

- Company type: Private
- Industry: Document management
- Founded: 2004
- Headquarters: San Francisco, CA
- Key people: Andy Wilson (Chief Executive); Sheng Yang (Chief Technology)

Logik is a San Francisco-based maker of e-discovery products. In 2009, Logik was named no. 181 to the Inc. 500 list, number one among e-discovery companies.

== History ==
Logik was founded in 2004 by Andy Wilson and Sheng Yang. Before starting Logik, the two worked for a small legal printing company, printing e-mails on paper to be reviewed by legal teams.

=== Finances ===
In 2005, the reported revenue was $373,866 and in 2008 it was $4.4 million. The total start-up costs for Logik were less than $20,000.

=== Founders ===
Wilson, CEO and co-founder of Logik, earned his degree in Decision Support Systems at Virginia Polytechnic Institute and State University and worked for Electronic Data Systems (EDS) as a software designer and then a small legal services company in Virginia before co-founding Logik. He now lives in San Francisco, CA with his wife and three children.

Yang, CTO and co-founder of Logik, earned his degree in Computer Engineering at Virginia Polytechnic Institute and State University as well. Yang designed the original Gridlogik processing engine specifically for Logik's use.

=== Location ===
The company's first office was in Dupont Circle, in Washington, DC. Currently, the office is located in San Francisco, CA.

== Inc. 500 ==
In 2009, Logik was recognized as No. 181 by Inc. 500, the highest rank for any eDiscovery company. Logik was No. 17 among businesses in Washington, Arlington, and Alexandria when ranked by metro area, and no. 13 when compared with other Business Products and Services when ranked by industry. Between 2004 and 2009, Logik grew 1,067.1%.

== Positioning in the eDiscovery Industry ==
In 2009, Inc. 500 named Logik as the top eDiscovery company. Logik offers online eDiscovery through their product Logikcull.com.

=== eDiscovery Processing Engine ===
Logikcull filters through electronic documents for customers, and according to their website, "identifies duplicate documents, extracts rich text, identifies the languages in a document, searches for keywords, extracts hidden documents, parses metadata, converts documents to static images (TIFF/PDF)."
