= Vodium =

Vodium is a Washington, DC–based company founded by Cameron Clarke and Keith Cich in June 2000 offering webcasting technology and services. In 2001 it introduced its flagship product, MediaPod Player, which integrated streaming audiovisual content with Powerpoint slides, graphics, images and text.

Vodium pioneered the use of synchronized text-to-video search which allowed viewers to rapidly search video of any length by the exact spoken word. Vodium's Datacoder is a production tool that provided editors with the capability to synchronize various content elements with any frame of the video.

Vodium also provided webcasting services for live and on-demand video to corporate, government, and NGO clients including Johnson & Johnson, the U.S. Dept. of Homeland Security, and the United Nations.

The company was sold to PrecisionIR in 2007.

== Products ==
- MediaPod Player
- MediaTracker – video search tool
- Datacoder
- ReViewer
- Autosyncher
