= Rodman's =

Grocery store and pharmacy in Washington, D.C.

Coordinates: 38°57′22.9″N 77°5′1.9″W

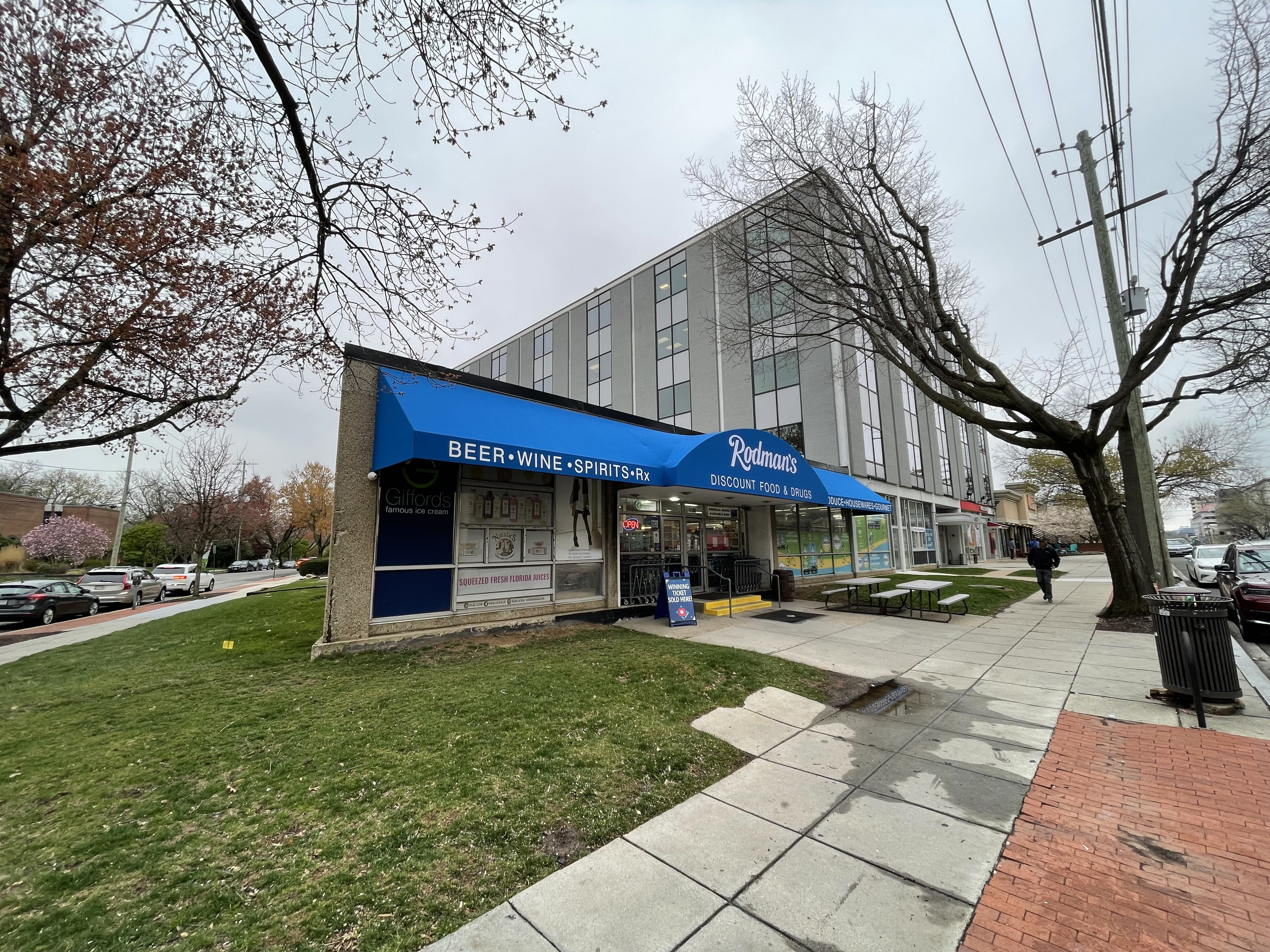
- Formerly: Rodman's Discount Drugs
- Industry: Specialty market and pharmacy
- Founded: 1955; 71 years ago
- Founders: Leonard Rodman
- Headquarters: Washington, D.C., United States

Rodman's is an international grocery store, wine shop, and pharmacy in the Friendship Heights neighborhood of Washington, D.C., with additional locations in Wheaton and Kensington, MD. The popular local discounter has been family-owned and operated since 1955. Rodman's has been anointed by the Washington Post as the "Weirdest Little Drugstore In Washington".

First located at 5317 Wisconsin Ave., a fire destroyed its original building in May 1965. It moved to a new location at 5100 Wisconsin Avenue in October of that year, where the flagship store still resides today. Around that time there were about 10 franchised locations around the DC area. The company bought back the Wheaton location the early 1960s, which still stands at 4301 Randolph Rd, Silver Spring, MD. The Kensington, MD, location opened around 1998.

Initially a discount drug store, Rodman's began selling discount gourmet foods in 1983. Today Rodman's sells a large selection of international foods, beer and wine, and a wide range of housewares and health and beauty supplies in the basement of the DC location.
