= Matt Fellowes =

American businessman (born 1975)

- Born: February 27, 1975 (age 51)
- Education: St. Lawrence University (B.A.); Georgetown University (M.A.); University of North Carolina at Chapel Hill (Ph.D.)
- Occupation: Businessman
- Known for: United Income

Matt Fellowes (born February 27, 1975) is an American financial technology entrepreneur. He is the founder and CEO of United Income, a retirement-focused online investment management, and financial planning company based in Washington, D.C. He previously founded financial planning technology company HelloWallet, which was acquired by Morningstar, Inc. in 2014 for $52.5 million.

In 2025, Fellowes was named at chief executive officer of Red Ventures company Bankrate.

== Education ==
Fellowes holds a Ph.D. from the University of North Carolina, Chapel Hill, a Master's in Public Policy from Georgetown University, and a B.A. from St. Lawrence University.

== Career ==
Fellowes was a Brookings Institution fellow from April 2004 to April 2008. His academic research focused on consumer finance, particularly poverty, household debt, and retirement planning. In 2008, he left Brookings to found financial planning technology company HelloWallet with a $1 million grant from the Rockefeller Foundation. Following the acquisition of HelloWallet by Morningstar, Inc. in 2014, Fellowes served as Chief Innovation Officer at Morningstar. In 2016, with $5 million in seed funding from his own resources, Morningstar, and eBay founder Pierre Omidyar's Omidyar Network, Fellowes founded online financial planning and investment management company United Income. United Income was acquired by Capital One Financial in August 2019.

=== United Income ===
Fellowes founded United Income in September 2016. United Income is an investment firm that offers a "hybrid service" with access to human advisors who rely on financial software in their decision-making process. The company deploys sets of statistics on investment performance, retiree spending, longevity, and other factors to simulate potential financial outcomes. Its "unified consumer finance system" recommends a retirement strategy based on millions of simulations for each individual. Its purpose is to offer retirees financial advice different from traditional financial planning software.

United Income's team of policy experts includes former U.S. Social Security Administration Director of the Office of Policy Evaluation and Modeling (OPEM) Howard Iams; former Bureau of Labor Statistics (BLS) commissioner Erica Groshen; former Deputy Assistant Secretary of the Treasury, Office of Tax Policy Adam Looney; former Deputy Assistant Secretary of the Treasury, Office of Retirement and Health Policy Mark Iwry; and Steve Utkus, Head of the Vanguard Center for Investor Research.

The company attracted $200 million in assets under management during its beta stage. United Income raised $5.8 million in seed funding in 2016. According to the U.S. Securities and Exchange Commission (SEC) filings, Morningstar, Inc. and Fellowes each own between 25% and 50% of United Income. A smaller stake is owned by the Omidyar Network, funded by billionaire eBay founder Pierre Omidyar. On July 31, 2019, Capital One acquired United Income.

== Awards ==
- Named a "Top 100 Business Game Changer" by the Huffington Post in 2010.
- Named a "2013 Tech Titan" by The Washingtonian.
