= MDB Communications =

- Industry: Advertising
- Founded: 1981 Michael David Brown
- Headquarters: 900 19th Street, NW 6th Floor Washington D.C. 20006, USA
- Area served: Worldwide
- Key people: Cary Hatch, CEO and Brand Advocate Richard Coad, CCO Carole Reuschle, VP, Media Director

MDB Communications is an American advertising and communications agency based in Washington, D.C. Founded in 1981, the agency was named in Inc. Magazine's "Inc. 500" list in 1998 and was also recognized on Advertising Age's "Top US Agency Brands by Revenue" in 2007.

== History ==
MDB Communications was founded in 1981 by Michael David Brown as a graphic design business. In 1987, current CEO Cary Hatch acquired the company and remodeled MDB into a full-service advertising agency.

Located at 900 19th Street, NW in downtown Washington, D.C. MDB Communications CCO, Richard Coad is the person credited with the architecture, strategy and creation of the concept that brought Subway Restaurants to national prominence.
