= Greenfield Belser =

American design firm

- Founded: 1984
- Founder: Donna Greenfield
- Fate: Acquired by Finn Partners (2016)
- Headquarters: Washington, D.C.
- Key people: Burkey Belser (President, Creative Director)
- Services: Brand Design firm

Greenfield/Belser Ltd. is a brand design firm headquartered in Washington, D.C. that focuses on professional services marketing for the legal, accounting, technology, consulting and financial sectors.

== History ==
Greenfield/Belser Ltd. was formed from two companies in 1984 when Burkey Belser, Inc., founded by Burkey Belser, and Greenfield/Belser, Inc., founded by Donna Greenfield, merged. It was an Inc magazine fastest-growing company finalist in the Washington region in 1997. Burkey Belser is the company's president and creative director and has served in this capacity since 1984, when Greenfield/Belser was officially incorporated. In August 2016, Finn Partners bought Greenfield Belser.

== Work ==
In 1992, Burkey Belser was contacted by David Aaron Kessler's staff at the U.S. Food and Drug Administration to help with the Nutrition Facts label because of his prior success designing the yellow EnergyGuide box that appears on all major appliances in the United States. Congress had mandated the reformulation of the label, but not its redesign. Belser undertook the project as a pro bono effort, for which he ultimately received a Presidential Design Award from President Bill Clinton. Massimo Vignelli called the design solution a “masterpiece”. The success of that initiative led the FDA to once again call on Belser to design the drug facts label that now appears on all over-the-counter drugs.

Information design, as in the Nutrition Facts assignment, is central to the firm's work but is not strictly representative. Rather, the firm focuses on brand strategy and its implementation across a variety of communication tactics such as identity programs, Web solutions and collateral sales materials.

In February 2011, the American Beverage Association enlisted Greenfield/Belser's help for their “Clear on Calories” initiative, resulting in a display of calorie counts on beverages across the country.

Greenfield/Belser has designed brands and programs for over 300 law firms including large international firms such as Jones Day, Clifford Chance and Morgan Lewis and small firms such as Marger Johnson. They have also created brands and programs for the Big Four accounting firms plus fast-growing regional accounting firms, like Reznick Group, Dixon Hughes Goodman and BKD. Greenfield/Belser recently redesigned the U.S. website for the World Wildlife Fund and rebranded all aspects of the Society for Human Resource Management, one of the largest associations in the world with 220,000 members.

== Publications ==
- Burkey Belser and Donna Greenfield authored 25 Years of Legal Branding (Sunnyside Press) published in 2004, a compilation of Greenfield/Belser's professional services work from 1979-2004.
- Greenfield/Belser's work also appears in other publications including: Absolutely the Newest Logos, Best of Corporate Identity Design, Big Book of Corporate Identity Designs (Watson-Guptill), Big Book of Design Ideas (Collins Design), Big Book of Letterhead and Web Site Designs (Watson-Guptill), Global Corporate Identity, Global Graphics: Symbols (Rockport Publishing), HOW Colossal Design, Large Graphics (Rockport Publishing), The Newest Logos, Promotions that Work (Rockport Publishing), Small Graphics (Rockport Publishing), and White Graphics (Rockport Publishing).
