= Quadrangle Development Corporation =

- Type: Privately-held company
- Industry: Real estate development
- Founded: 1971; 55 years ago
- Headquarters: Washington, D.C.,
- Area served: Mid-Atlantic U.S.
- Key people: Christopher Gladstone, President
- Products: Hotels, resorts, residences
- Revenue: $81 million (2011 est.)
- Number of employees: 180
- Website: quadrangledevcorp.com

Quadrangle Development Corporation is a privately held, vertically integrated real estate development company based in Washington, D.C., in the United States. By 2002, it was one of the largest real estate developers in the Washington, D.C., metropolitan area.

As of April 2011, the company owned 83 properties (consisting of apartment buildings, condominiums, hotels, and office buildings) totaling 22,000,000 square feet (2,000,000 m^{2}) and worth $8.4 billion.

== History ==
Quadrangle Development Corporation was founded in 1971 by Robert Gladstone and James R. Crozier. The company originally focused on constructing apartment complexes, but after a few years began erecting office buildings and hotels.

In December 2014, Chairman Robert Gladstone died at his home in Washington, D.C.

=== Notable projects ===
Among the many projects which Quadrangle Development Corporation has been involved in are:

- The JW Marriott Hotel Washington in 1979.
- The Shops at National Place/eat at National Place and the National Theatre, which were part of the redevelopment of Pennsylvania Avenue NW in the late 1970s and the early 1980s.
- The Grand Hyatt Washington in 1987.
- The Washington Center Office office building at 1001 G Street NW in 1989.
- Hyatt Regency Chesapeake Bay Golf Resort, Spa & Marina near Annapolis, Maryland, in 2001. This site includes the River Marsh Golf Course.
- MedImmune Inc. headquarters in Gaithersburg, Maryland, in 2003.
- The Hilton Baltimore in 2008.
- Towers Crescent mixed-use development at Tysons Corner, Virginia, in 2009.
- Mount Vernon Place, a mixed-use development at Mount Vernon Triangle in Washington, D.C. (under construction as of October 2012).
- Washington Marriott Marquis, an 1,175-room "headquarters hotel" next to the Walter E. Washington Convention Center in Washington, D.C. (Opened May 1, 2014).
- Potomac Overlook, a proposed mixed-use development in Rosslyn, Virginia, with 1,775 apartments and a 200-key hotel.
