= Selmedica =

Selmedica is a Washington, D.C., corporation and an FDA-registered drug and dietary supplement manufacturer.

The Food and Drug Administration (FDA) issued a warning letter to Selmedica in 2005 regarding its marketing practices.

The Better Business Bureau (BBB) reported receiving 48 inquiries about Selmedica in the early 2000s, all but one of which it marked as settled in 2005.

On March 24, 2008, Selmedica CEO Perry Belcher was arrested on charges of computer fraud exceeding $10,000, imitating a licensed professional, and deceptive business practices. Officials in Shelby County, Tennessee, charged that he fabricated testimonials from nonexistent doctors, fraudulently claimed FDA approval for his products, and engaged in other deceptive promotional activities. Belcher pleaded guilty in September 2008, receiving a 10-year suspended sentence and agreeing to forfeit approximately $1 million in assets.
