= REACH! Partnership School =

Charter high school in Baltimore, Maryland

The REACH! Partnership School

Location
- 2555 Harford Road; Baltimore, Maryland 21213; 39°19′3.1″N 76°35′34.8″W

Information
- School type: Public, Charter
- School district: Baltimore City Public Schools
- School number: 341
- Principal: James Gresham
- Grades: 9–12
- Enrollment: 545 (2018)
- Area: Urban
- Affiliation: Civic Works
- Website: Baltimore City Schools

The REACH! Partnership School is a public charter high school located in the northeast area known as Clifton Park of Baltimore, Maryland. REACH! is operated by Civic Works, a Baltimore nonprofit affiliated with the AmeriCorps program.

The school shared the campus of the former Lake Clifton Eastern High School campus with Heritage High School from 2010 until the closure of the latter after the 2014–2015 school year.

For the 2019–2020 school year, as part of Baltimore City's 21st Century Schools initiative, REACH! was scheduled to relocate to the nearby Fairmount-Harford building, at 2555 Harford Road, previously occupied by the defunct Harbor City High School. The school's new location was originally built to serve as Clifton Park Junior High in 1924.

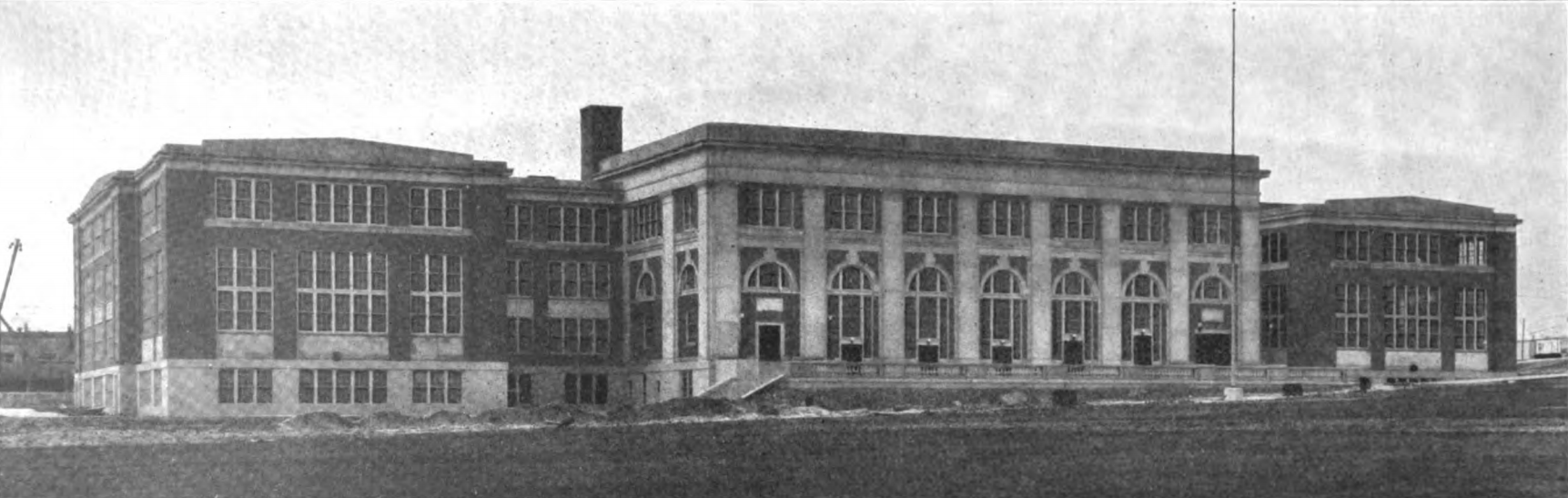
An exterior photo of Clifton Park Junior High Baltimore in 1923

The school offers vocational education through its CTE Pathways in either "Construction & Development" (carpentry or HVAC) or "Health & Biosciences" (Nursing assistant or Pharmacy technician). It also offers two Advanced Placement courses in English and History & social sciences. In addition, the school hosts an Army JROTC program.
