= Doris M. Johnson High School =

Former high school in Maryland, USA

Coordinates: 39°19′7″N 76°35′12″W

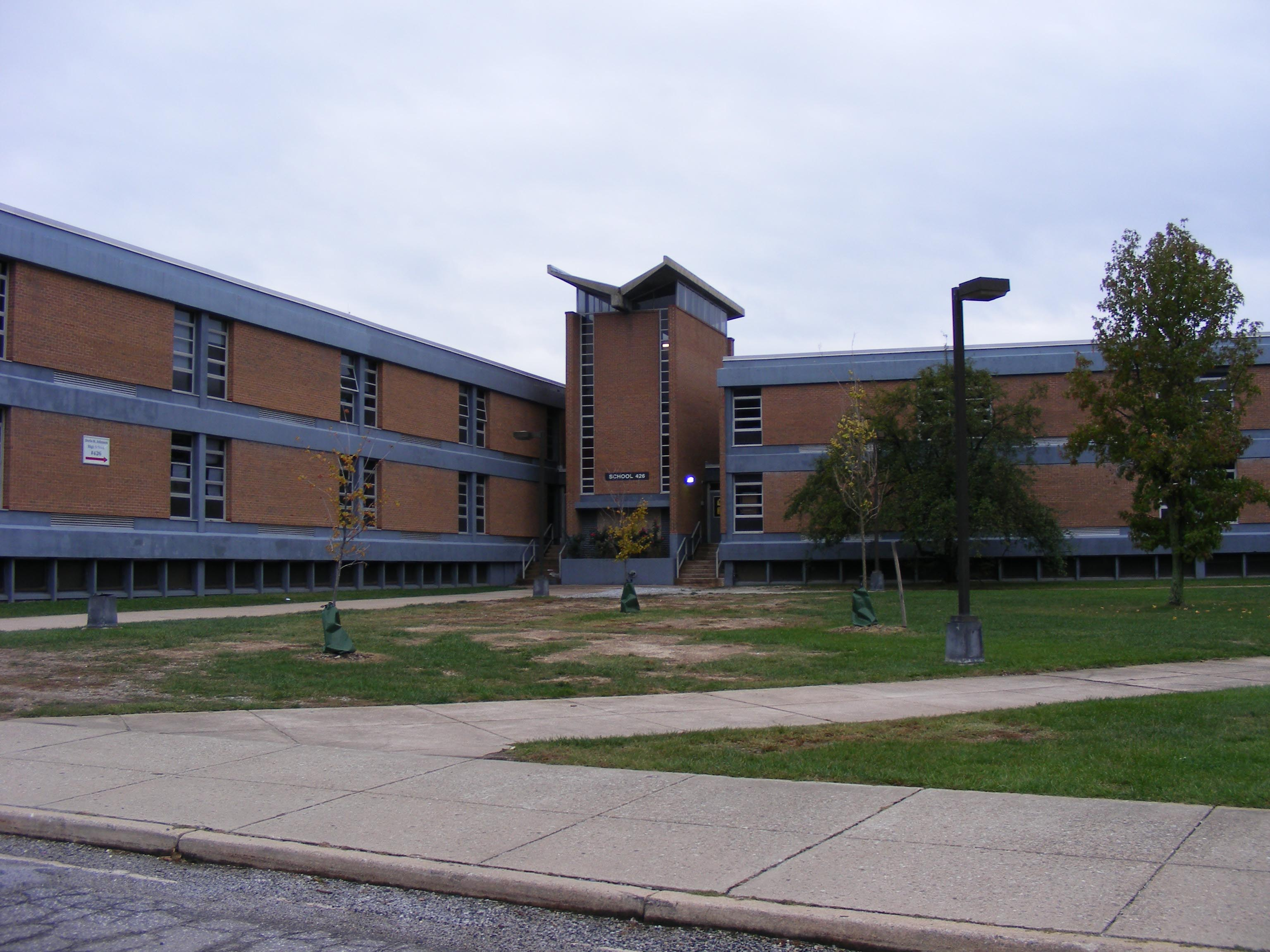

Location
- 2801 Saint Lo Drive; Baltimore, Maryland 21213; United States

Information
- School type: Defunct, Public, Comprehensive
- Motto: Success is the only option
- Founded: 2003
- Closed: 2011
- School district: Baltimore City Public Schools
- School number: 426
- Principal: Sandra Powell
- Grades: 9–12
- Enrollment: 448 (2011)
- Area: Urban
- Mascot: Dolphin (inherited from Lake Clifton-Eastern High School)
- Team name: Lake Clifton Lakers (inherited from Lake Clifton-Eastern High School)

Doris M. Johnson High School was a public high school housed in the former Lake Clifton-Eastern High School (LCEHS) in the northeast area known as Clifton Park of Baltimore, Maryland.

It was formerly known as School #426 at the Lake Clifton Campus that was operational in the 2003–2004 school year as a result of the breakup of Lake Clifton-Eastern into two smaller high schools. In 2005—2006, a portion of the high school was formally named Doris M. Johnson High School. The comprehensive high school specializes in the law and leadership focus.

At the January 26, 2011 Baltimore City School Board meeting, school system CEO, Dr. Andrés Alonso announced that Doris M. Johnson would be among five schools to close at the conclusion of the 2010–2011 school year, pending board approval. The REACH! Partnership School that currently shares campus space with Doris M. Johnson will expand to utilize the newly vacant parts of the Lake Clifton campus.

== History ==
When the school first opened in it was named School #426 at the Lake Clifton Campus until the 2005 school year when the Baltimore City School Board passed a resolution renaming the school to Doris M. Johnson High School. Doris M. Johnson was a Baltimore community leader for the Coldstream-Homestead-Montebello community, she started the local Adopt-A-House program and was a BCPSS School Board member and a member of the board of elections. It was decided by students, staff and the community to rename the school to remind future generations of Ms. Johnson's contributions.

== History Channel relationship ==
=== Save Our History ===
In May 2006, the History Channel's Save Our History initiative mentioned in their newsletter Doris M. Johnson High School. In 2005, the newsletter stated a Save Our History grant was awarded to the school in partnership of the Maryland Historical Society that funds a project that introduces students to the history of Clifton Park. The Clifton Park community was once a center of Baltimore City for "business, entertainment, worship, and strong social familial, and community pride" but has recently become impoverished and in History Channel's words "its proud history was in danger of being lost."

Guidance for the project was given by Doris M. Johnson's principal Tricia Rock, a history teacher Michael Douglas, and Jennifer Yaremczak from the Maryland Historical Society. The students obtained oral histories from community members and thoroughly researched the history of the public park surrounding the Lake Clifton complex, the history of the African American cemetery in the community, movie theaters, baseball parks, and the histories of the origin of local street names. A book was produced by students titled "My Neighborhood: A Social and Cultural History of Northeast Baltimore" which is available with transcripts of the oral histories at Doris Johnson and the MHS.

=== Civil Rights Movement in Baltimore ===
In 2006, another project was conducted by the school and the MHS, the project focused on the Civil Rights Movement in Baltimore, the integration of Gwynn Oak Park, the Northwood Shopping Center, the Route 40 campaign during the Freedom Rides, the Holy Week Riots of 1968 and Baltimore riot of 1968, and the Cambridge riot of 1963 and 1967. Students again, collected oral histories from community members regarding their experiences of the 1960s and the Civil Rights Movement. Students wrote essays that was compiled into a book and website [www.mdcivilrights.org] as well.

== Unchained Talent ==
Doris M. Johnson ROTC at the 2008 Morgan State University Homecoming Parade

The after-school performing arts program started in the 2004 school year by volunteer Christina Youngston, and the club was given the name Unchained Talent by students. Unchained Talent is unique in that the school system does not provide the drama program for the school; Unchained Talent is a non-profit and sustains itself through donations and charitable giving.

The first theatrical production Unchained Talent did occurred in December 2004 in front of an audience of 100 and it made front-page news in the Baltimore Sun newspaper. A local news affiliate did a segment and it drew attention from local Councilwoman Mary Pat Clarke, the Mayor's Office and United States Congressman Elijah Cummings.

Since 2004, Unchained Talent has put on two to three productions per school year, most of them student written. In 2005, Unchained Talent had a big milestone in that it was awarded an Open Society Institute-Baltimore Community Fellowship to stabilize the program for 18 months.

Unchained Talent expanded to include students from Heritage High School and the REACH school. Unfortunately new principals did not support the program and Unchained Talent moved out of the Lake Clifton Campus in 2012 to focus on expansion programs that had been established in several other schools and a citywide site.

== Student data ==
Enrollment
2008-2009: 533
2007-2008: 521
2006-2007: 622
2005-2006: 410

== Former and notable faculty ==
- Tricia Rock, first principal (2003—2009)
- Sandra Powell, last principal (2010)
