= Lake Clifton =

Lake Clifton may refer to:

- Lake Clifton, Western Australia
- A former reservoir near Clifton Park, Baltimore
  - Lake Clifton Eastern High School in Clifton Park
