= Baltimore Freedom Academy =

Former charter middle-high school in Baltimore, Maryland

Baltimore Freedom Academy -

Location
- 101 South Caroline Street; Baltimore, Maryland 21231; United States; 39°17′24.6″N 76°35′48.7″W

Information
- School type: Public, Charter, Defunct
- Motto: We Learn. We Lead. We Serve.
- Founded: 2003
- Founder: Tisha Edwards
- Closed: 2013
- School district: Baltimore City Public Schools
- School number: 423
- Principals: Noel Green (High school); Danielle Shylit (Middle school)
- Grades: 6-12
- Enrollment: 503 (2011)
- Area: Urban
- Mascot: Barristers
- Partnerships: University of Maryland School of Law; St. Francis Academy
- Website: baltimorefreedomacademy.org

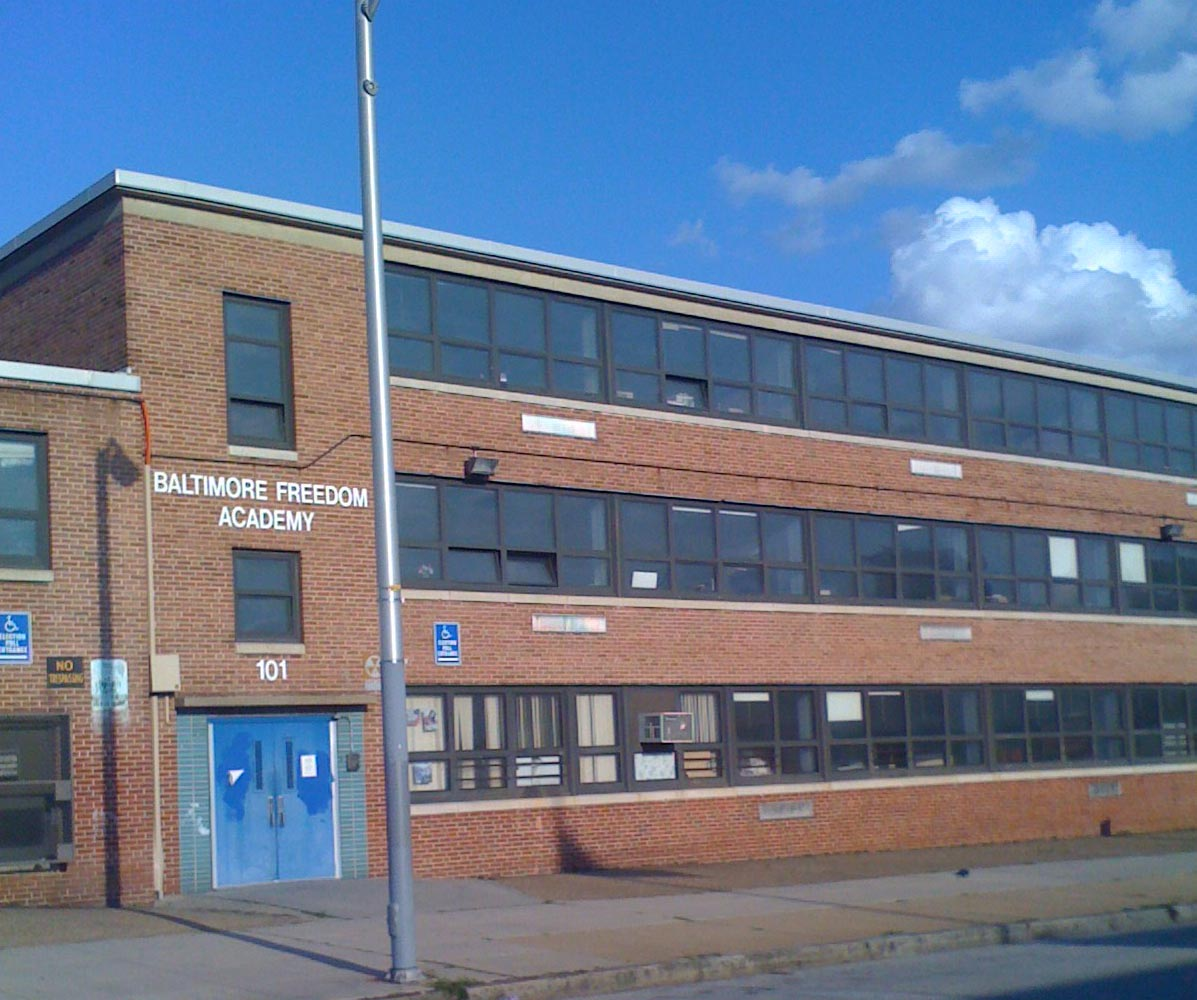
The main entrance view of Baltimore Freedom Academy

Baltimore Freedom Academy (BFA) was a Baltimore City middle-high school, located for most of its existence in the Washington Hill neighborhood. Founded in 2003 as a public "innovation school," beginning in 2008 it operated as a charter school. The school was open to students citywide through the Baltimore City Public Schools lottery system. Baltimore Freedom Academy was closed by Baltimore City Public Schools following the 2013 school year.

== History ==
=== Origin ===
The initial approval for Baltimore Freedom Academy came when Community Law in Action (CLIA), a Baltimore-area non-profit, was one of four groups to receive a $20,000 planning grant from Baltimore City Public Schools. BCPSS hoped for these outside groups to create "innovation" schools, which could serve as small models for future schools. CLIA was awarded their grant for a plan to establish Baltimore Freedom Academy as a new 350-student school that "would use a combination of traditional and law-related curricula as well as hands-on learning." A focus of the proposed school would also be on community activism and social justice.

Baltimore Freedom Academy opened in the fall of 2003 with a freshman class of 105, and new plans for an eventual capacity of 400. The school's founding principal was Tisha Edwards, who had a previous career in social work, but no education experience. In the first year of operation, BFA was temporarily housed in space at Baltimore City Community College. The first year proved difficult, with 75% (6 of 8) of the initial teaching staff not returning for the next year, but the school did secure a new permanent home further east, in an unused floor of Lombard Middle School.

=== Lombard Street ===
By the time it was considered for co-use by the BFA, Lombard Middle School was under capacity, with some sections empty. Built beginning in 1960, with a formal dedication in April 1963, the school complex, built by Piracci Construction Company for $2.7 million (equivalent to $29,820,205 in 2025), was designed with a maximum capacity of 2,400 students. In 2005 it had been one of six Baltimore schools that were identified as "persistently dangerous" by the state school board under No Child Left Behind Act reporting requirements.

As it had been preparing to move into its new location, in July 2004, BFA received a private donation of 30 laptops worth approximately $50,000, but all were stolen from the school in December of the same year. Despite this, students in the fall of 2004 rated Baltimore Freedom Academy the second safest school in Baltimore, after the New Era Academy. Plans to phase out the troubled Lombard Middle began in 2007, eventually leaving Baltimore Freedom Academy the sole occupant of the building.

Starting in 2008, BFA was converted into a charter school. The school had desired to convert in 2007, but filed its application too late. Also in 2008, it was allowed to expand from a pure high school, adding grades sixth through eight. By this time, the school had 280 students. In 2009, BFA's founding head of school Edwards left to become chief of staff to BCPSS CEO Andres Alonso (who she would replace as interim CEO four years later).

=== Closure ===
In January 2013, a district panel recommended that Baltimore Freedom Academy's charter contract with Baltimore City Schools not be renewed. At a public panel later in the month, BFA representatives argued the review process had been unfair, and that it did not capture all the areas of growth the school had made with its students. Nevertheless, the board voted to revoke the BFA's charter in February and close it at the end of the 2013 school year.

== Academics ==
BFA had partnerships with the University of Maryland Law School to help the students become advocates through what the school called leadership learning.
