= Achievement Academy (Baltimore, Maryland) =

Alternative high school in Baltimore, MD, USA

Location
- 2201 Pinewood Avenue; Baltimore, Maryland 21218; United States; 39°21′56.77″N 76°34′15.46″W

Information
- School type: Public, Adult, Alternative
- School district: Baltimore City Public Schools
- School number: 413
- Principal: David Verdi
- Grades: 9-12
- Enrollment: 411 (2018)
- Area: Urban
- Mascot: Pirate
- Website: www.baltimorecityschools.org/schools/413

Achievement Academy, officially Achievement Academy at Harbor City High School, is a public alternative high school located in Baltimore, Maryland, United States. The school currently resides in the former Northern High School campus, at 2201 Pinewood Avenue. Achievement Academy is an alternative school program operated by Baltimore City Public Schools to serve students with severe academic and/or behavior issues.

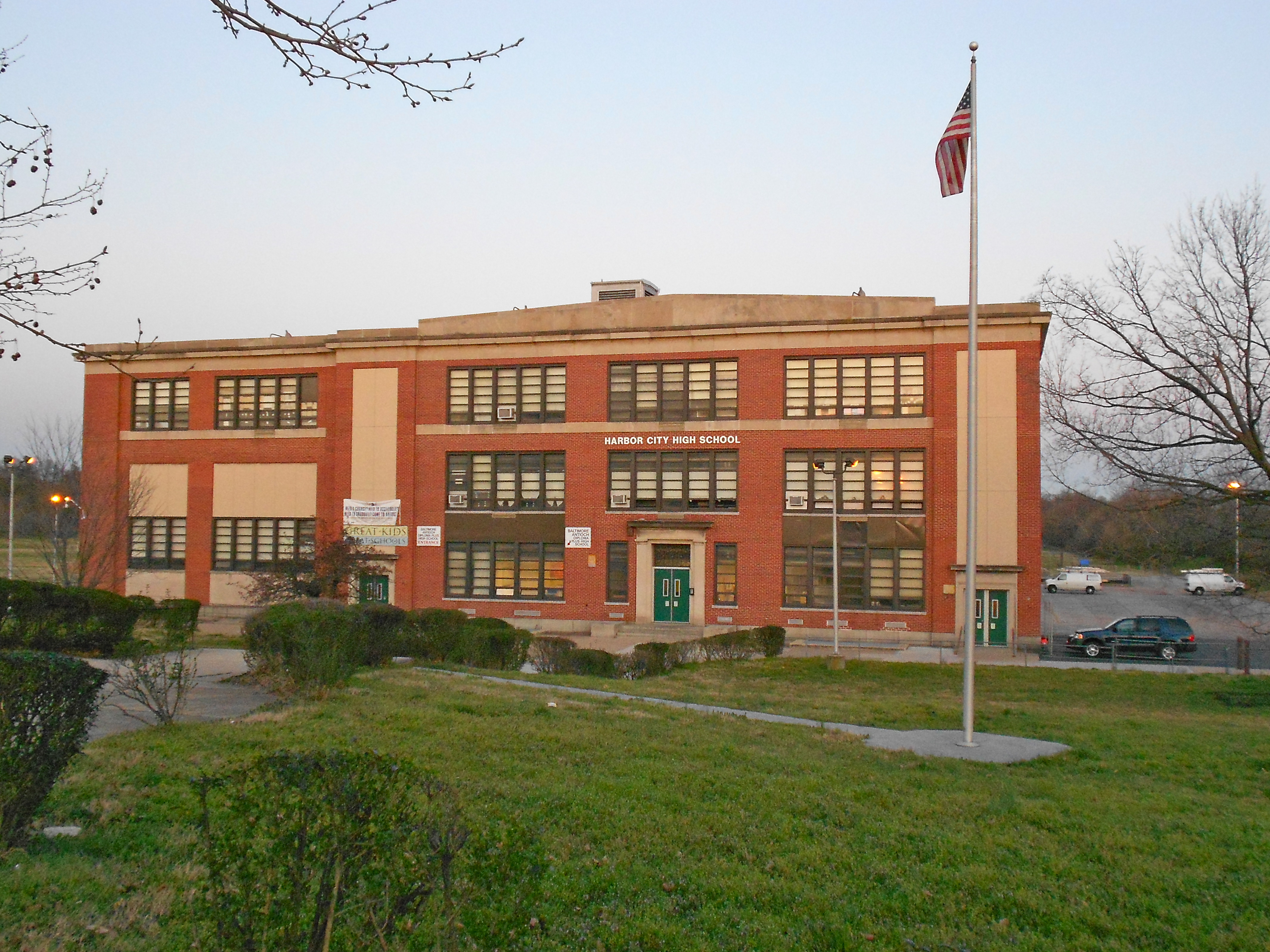
Achievement Academy's previous home in the building of the former Harbor City High School, 2555 Harford Road

From 2010 until 2015, the school was located at 2555 Harford Road, inside of the former Harbor City High School. Beginning with the 2008 school year, Achievement Academy shared this space with Baltimore Antioch Diploma Plus High School, but this latter school was closed by Baltimore City Public Schools in 2014.

It was reported in 2012 that BCPSS, then under the leadership of CEO Andres Alonso, was planning to close Achievement Academy as one of 26 closures citywide. Instead of closure however, the Board of School Commissioners voted to move the school to its current location within the Northern High School campus in 2015, replacing W.E.B. DuBois High School which had been closed there the previous summer. It now shares that building with Reginald F. Lewis High School.

Notable alumni include DoDat who is known for making an appearance on Druski’s YouTube show.
