= Southside Academy =

Location
- 2700 Seamon Avenue; Baltimore, Maryland 21225; United States; 39°15′13″N 76°37′13″W

Information
- School type: Public, Comprehensive, Defunct
- Founded: 1998
- School district: Baltimore City Public Schools
- Principal: Denise Gordon
- Grades: 9–12
- Enrollment: 281 (2011)
- Area: Urban
- Mascot: Jaguar
- Website: www.southsideacademy.org

Southside Academy was a public high school located in Baltimore, Maryland, United States. It was closed by Baltimore City Public Schools in 2013.
