= Pratt Street =

Street in Baltimore

Coordinates: 39°17′11.47″N 76°36′48.7″W

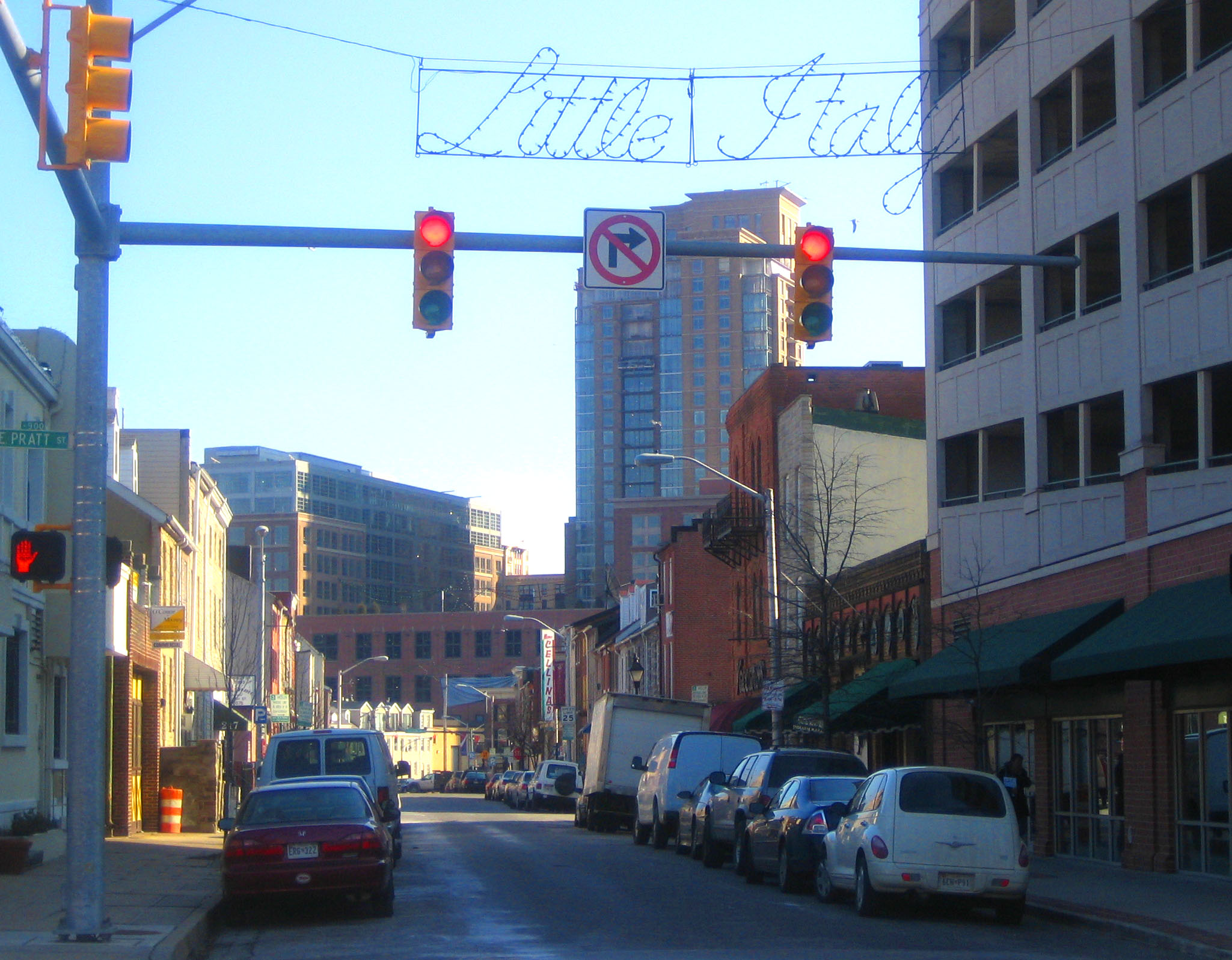
- Little Italy's Pratt Street in February 2007
- Interactive map of Pratt Street
- Owner: City of Baltimore
- Location: Baltimore
- Postal code: 21201, 21202, 21223, 21224, 21231
- West end: Frederick Avenue
- East end: Patterson Park Avenue

Pratt Street is a major street in Baltimore, Maryland, United States. It forms a one-way pair of streets with Lombard Street that run west–east through downtown Baltimore. For most of their route, Pratt Street is one-way in an eastbound direction, and Lombard Street is one way westbound. Both streets begin in west Baltimore at Frederick Avenue and end in Butcher's Hill at Patterson Park Avenue. Since 2005, these streets have been open to two-way traffic from Broadway until their end at Patterson Park. Although Lombard is also a two-way street from Fulton Avenue to Martin Luther King Jr. Boulevard, Pratt is still one-way eastbound in this area.

To the east of Patterson Park, both Pratt and Lombard Streets start again. Pratt continues as a side street from Linwood Avenue until Haven Street.

Pratt Street has historic significance as the location of the Baltimore Riot of 1861. Today it is known for being an important gateway into the Inner Harbor, connecting it with the Baltimore Light Rail line. It is for the latter reason that the city decided to redesign the street and surrounding area to be more pedestrian-friendly.

Pratt Street is named for Charles Pratt, 1st Earl Camden a supporter of Civil liberties in the 18th century, and not the noted Baltimorean Enoch Pratt (1808–1896). Pratt Street appears on maps of Baltimore as early as 1801.

Pratt Street was ranked the 33rd "most expensive city street" in the United States.

== Notable landmarks and attractions on Pratt Street ==
- Runs through Little Italy
- Oriole Park at Camden Yards (nearby)
- Baltimore Convention Center
- Harborplace
- Inner Harbor
- National Aquarium
- Pratt Street Power Plant
- Power Plant Live! (nearby)
- B&O Railroad Museum
- Camden Station
- 100 East Pratt Street
- University of Maryland, Baltimore
- Harborplace Redevelopment (coming soon)
- Reginald F. Lewis Museum of Maryland African American History & Culture
- Flag House & Star-Spangled Banner Museum
- Baltimore Freedom Academy
- Stratford University

=== Defunct attractions ===
- Ripley's Believe It or Not! Odditorium at Harborplace (2012–2020, nearby)
- The Gallery (1987–2022)
- ESPN Zone Power Plant (1998–2010)
- Six Flags Power Plant (1985–1987, P.T. Flagg's nightclub closed 1990)
