= Mary Dobkin =

Russian born American sports coach and children's advocate (1902-1987)

Mary Dobkin (August 30, 1902 – August 22, 1987) was an American amateur sports coach and advocate for children.

== Early life ==
Dobkin was a tiny child when her father died; soon after, she left Russia in the care of an aunt and uncle, and settled in Baltimore, Maryland. That domestic arrangement was also short-lived, and ended when Mary was found alone and unconscious on a winter night, with no shoes and severe frostbite, when she was six years old. She spent much of her remaining childhood in hospitals, enduring a long series of operations, including the amputation of both feet and part of one leg. Dobkin used a wheelchair or crutches for most of her life.

By 1910, Mary resided with and had been adopted by Anne and Harry Dobkin. (1910 census and family history as retold by Mary's niece, Bessie Pearlman Cohen.)

Dobkin remembered hearing the crowds at Baltimore Orioles games from her hospital room, and that sparked an interest in baseball. She also remembered learning to speak English from a radio in the hospital, and learning to read from deciphering the sports pages in newspapers.

== Coaching and advocacy ==
Having spent most of her childhood in hospitals or other care homes, and without any family connections, Dobkin lived in relative poverty as an adult, in public housing in Baltimore. She believed baseball could encourage the children in her neighborhood as it had done for her, so she raised funds for equipment and uniforms, and started a team, the Dobkin Dynamites, which she coached. In time the Mary Dobkin Athletic Club reached over 50,000 Baltimore children, and expanded to softball, basketball and football activities as well. Her youth sports programs were mainly supported by donations and benefactors, prominent among them Dr. Ralph and Ida Katz.

In 1941, Dobkin became the first woman to serve as Baltimore's municipal baseball manager. In 1965, the Baltimore Orioles held a "Mary Dobkin Day" to honor the local coach for her work, and invited two of the boys involved in her programs to be honorary batboys for that game. Dobkin threw the ceremonial first pitch at the sixth game of the 1979 World Series, played in Baltimore.

A Hallmark Hall of Fame television movie, Aunt Mary (1979), starred Jean Stapleton as Dobkin.

"I was the first manager to integrate a team, the first to play a girl, the first to coach three sports (baseball, basketball, and football), the first living person to have a playing field named for them, and now I'm the first to have my story told on TV," Dobkin noted of her many accomplishments, in 1979.

== Personal life and legacy ==
Dobkin always volunteered her services, because a salary would have jeopardized her disability benefits. Beyond sports, she was noted for throwing an annual Christmas party for the children of her neighborhood.

Mary Dobkin died in August 1987, age 84, after a stroke. A Mary Dobkin Park was dedicated in Baltimore in 1975. There is an exhibit about Mary Dobkin at the Babe Ruth Birthplace and Museum in Baltimore.

Among the alumni of Dobkin teams were Tom Phoebus of the Baltimore Orioles, and Ron Swoboda of the New York Mets.

== See also ==
- Virginia S. Baker (1921–1998), advocate for children and director of the Baltimore City recreation center in Patterson Park that is now named in her honor.
