= Eastern High School (Maryland) =

Historic school building in Maryland, USA

- U.S. National Register of Historic Places
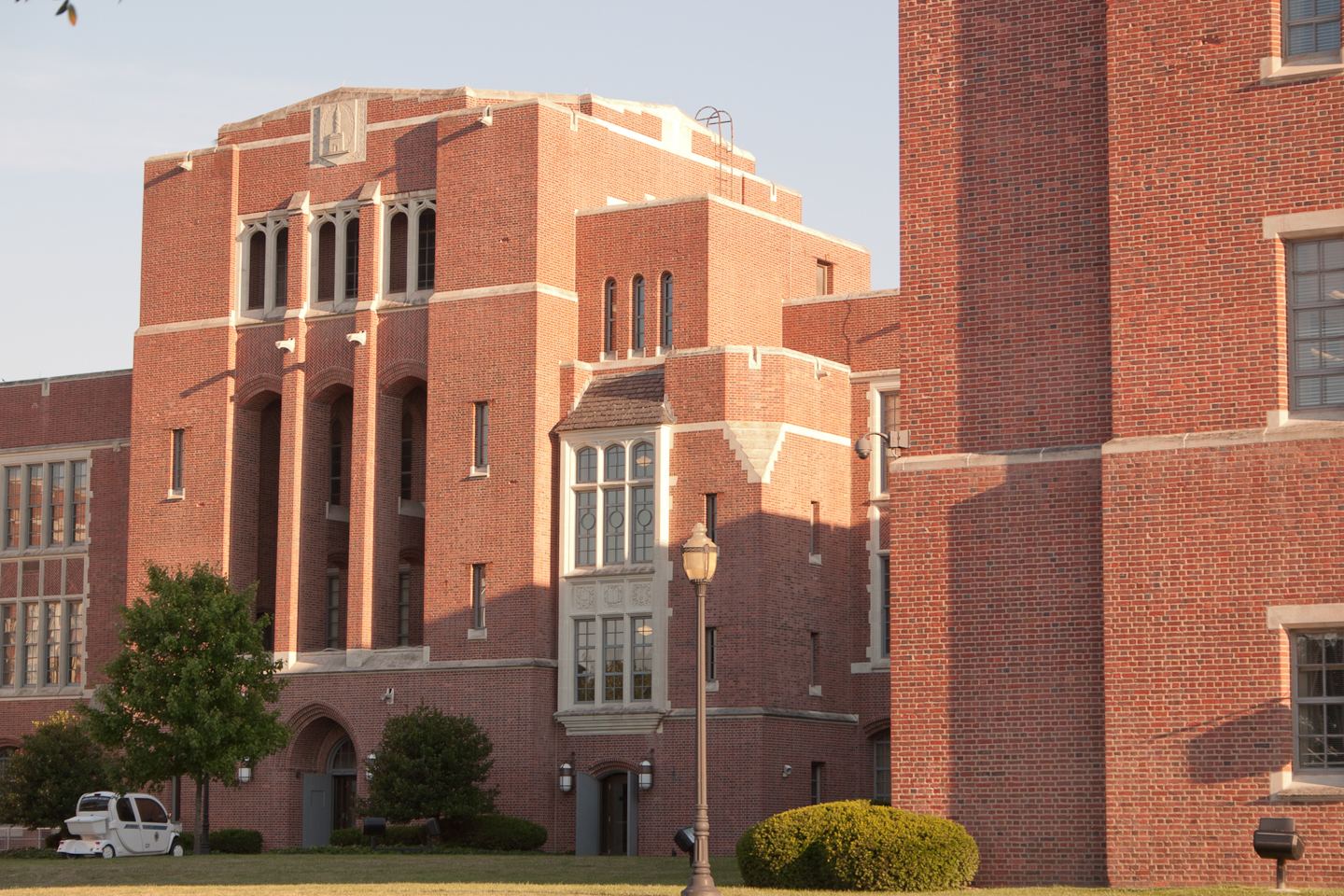
- old Eastern High School, 33rd Street and Loch Raven Boulevard, August 2011

- Location within Baltimore
- Location: 1101 East 33rd Street at Loch Raven Boulevard; Baltimore, Maryland, 21218, U.S.A.
- Coordinates: 39°19′40″N 76°36′8″W
- Area: 17 acres (6.9 ha)
- Built: 1936—1938
- Architects: James Edmunds; Herbert Crisp
- Architectural style: Tudor Revival & Jacobethan
- NRHP reference No.: 00000870
- Added to NRHP: August 16, 2000

Eastern High School, established in 1844 along with its sister school Western High School, was a historic all-female, public high school located in Baltimore City, Maryland, 21218, U.S.A. Its final building, at 1101 East 33rd Street, is to the west of The Baltimore City College, also at 33rd Street, and across the street from the former site of Memorial Stadium. E.H.S. was operated by the Baltimore City Public Schools system at successive locations until it was closed in 1986. The final building was renovated in the 1990s and is currently owned and used for offices by the Johns Hopkins Medical Institutions. It was listed on the National Register of Historic Places in 2000.

== History ==
In 1839, the Board of School Commissioners of Baltimore City established the first public high school in Baltimore, City College. While public schools for white students of both sexes had been in operation since 1829, girls were not given the opportunity to advance beyond a "Primary" education until 1844. The Baltimore Board of Education wrote in 1843 that "[girls] who may have manifested superior abilities and attained suitable acquirements[sic] in the Primary Schools" should be given the same chance at a higher level of education as the male students, though girls were not given opportunities to study languages or advanced science and mathematics for several decades. (African-American children in Baltimore were not able to attend a public school until 1867, when the Baltimore City Council opened 13 primary schools for "Colored" students.)

Believing female students too delicate to be able to assemble from across the city at one central school like boys did for City College, two schools for girls were established: Eastern and Western High Schools, named for their location in the city relative to the Jones Falls. In order for a young lady to attend Eastern, she had to meet certain requirements: She had to be twelve or older, had to have spent at least one year in a female primary school, have good moral character, and pass an entrance examination. Additionally, there was a tuition of $1.00 a quarter unless a student could obtain a tuition waver from the Board of Education. Originally, girls could attend Eastern for three years; in 1867, this was changed to four years. Further changes to instruction came in 1898, when electives were introduced to the school and it was possible for students to specialize somewhat their area of study at Eastern, instead of taking each subject (math, science, history, etc.) in detail all three or four years.

The school colors of green and gold, the school flag, and the school song were all adopted by 1920. In 1924, Laura J. Cairnes became the first female high school principal in Baltimore when she took over the position at EHS.

During World War II, the students of Eastern were actively raising money through the sale of bonds and stamps. According to records kept by the War Stamp and Bond Project committee at the school, over $200,000 (1943 value) was raised from between December 8, 1941 to June 1943.

In September 1954, following the decision in Brown v. Board of Education, Baltimore city schools were integrated and African-American girls were eligible to attend E.H.S for the first time in its history. On February 20, 1970, the school dismissed students early in response to a student protest over a white teacher using an ethnic slur on a black student in class. The police were called and allegedly began beating students and using mace (spray) and tear gas to get them to go back to class or to get them out of the school. Another incident of police beating black students allegedly occurred at neighboring City College the same day. By 1984, the school was predominately African-American.

In 1979, Eastern High School became coeducational and added on a business magnet program to the regular curriculum. Additionally, after some years of serving the entire neighborhoods of Ednor Gardens-Lakeside and Waverly, it once again limited admission to those who met a series of criteria. Despite this, Eastern's time was coming to an end. In 1984, hoping to shrink a school system that had over-expanded in the 1970's, the Baltimore City Public Schools system included Eastern on a list of schools to be closed, citing low test scores, low admission, and cost of repairs for the building. Allegations flew that the real reason behind the closure was to provide more parking space for neighboring Memorial Stadium, located at 900 East 33rd St. Already by this point, a large strip of lawn had been taken by the city from Eastern for the purpose of creating 1,200 new parking spaces at the stadium. An appeal was filed by supporters of the school but rejected. In June 1986, following the end of the school year, Eastern High School was closed for good. Many students, and the business magnet program ended up at nearby Lake Clifton, at one point the largest public high school in America. Lake Clifton-Eastern, as it came to be known, was dismantled in 2003, though the building is still in use by the Reach! Partnership School.

== Locations ==
Throughout its 142-year history, Eastern High School moved to different buildings as the number of students enrolled in the school outgrew the schoolhouse, or as the building became too old or damaged to use further.

1. From November 1844 to July 1852: Front and Pitt (now called Fayette) Streets
2. From September 1852 to August 1868: Aisquith and Mullikin Streets
3. From August 1868 to August 1870: Baltimore and Lloyd Streets
4. From September 1870 to December 1906: Aisquith and Orleans Streets, in a Greek Revival building designed by R. Snowden Andrews
5. From January 1907 to February 1938: Broadway and North Avenue
6. From February 1938 to June 1986: East 33rd Street and Loch Raven Boulevard

The last building was a three-story, H-shaped structure, with a main lateral section and four projecting wings. Designed by James R. Edmunds Jr. and Herbert G. Crisp, who had designed the new Western High School building almost a decade earlier, the campus at E. 33rd and Loch Raven Boulevard was noted for its structural design and large, shady yard. It has a steel and concrete superstructure frame with red brick cladding and carved limestone trim in the Tudor Revival or (Jacobethan) style. Closed in 1986, this building was renovated in the 1990s. It is considered a historical/architectural landmark in the City and is currently owned and used for offices by the Johns Hopkins Medical Institutions, a part of the Johns Hopkins Hospital and the Johns Hopkins University institutions. The Eastern High School building at East 33rd St. was listed on the National Register of Historic Places in 2000, which is maintained by the National Park Service of the U.S. Department of the Interior.

After the death of EHS alumna and former WHS teacher Lizette Woodward Reese in 1935, her friend, sculptor Grace H. Turnbull, gifted a memorial in Reese's honor to Eastern High School. Titled "The Good Shepherd," it depicts a shepherd, cradling a lamb while his flock stands behind him. It was installed on the grounds of the school in 1939. Despite the efforts of the principal of Western High School to have the monument moved to her school after Eastern's closure in 1986, it remains at its original location.

== Notable alumni and faculty ==
- Virginia S. Baker, class of 1939, civil servant and namesake of the Virginia S. Baker Recreation Center Patterson Park
- Laura J. Cairnes, the first woman principal of the E.H.S. in 1924, when it was located on the southeast corner of East North Avenue and Broadway.
- Vashti Murphy McKenzie, first woman bishop in the African Methodist Episcopal Church.
- Elsie Shutt, first woman to start a software business in the United States.
- Lizette Woodworth Reese, poet and later English teacher at Western High School.
- Rose Zetzer, first woman admitted to the Maryland State Bar Association
