= Virginia S. Baker =

American civil servant (1921 – 1998)

- Born: August 16, 1921; Baltimore, Maryland, US
- Died: July 29, 1998 (aged 76); Baltimore, Maryland, US
- Education: High school
- Alma mater: Eastern High School
- Known for: Civil servant
- Memorials: Virginia S. Baker Recreation Center

Virginia S. Baker (August 16, 1921 – July 29, 1998) was an American civil servant and employee of the Department of Recreation and Parks in Baltimore City, Maryland, U.S. She was known by a number of nicknames, such as Queenie, Queen of Fun, Baltimore's First Lady of Fun, "queen of the hill", and "Baltimore's oldest kid". In 1984, the recreation center in Patterson Park was named the Virginia S. Baker Recreation Center to honor Baker's years of service to the center and to the children of Baltimore.

Baker started her career as a volunteer playground monitor at the old Patterson Park recreation center and was hired to work for the Department of Recreation and Parks right after graduating from Eastern High School in 1939. She held a variety of job titles in her 53 years of civil service. She was best known for the many events and programs she initiated as director of the "Adventures in Fun" office, an office in City Hall created specifically for Baker by former Baltimore Mayor William Donald Schaefer.

In an address to the Senate, U.S. Senator from Maryland and Baltimore-native Barbara Mikulski made a special tribute to Baker following her death in 1998. Baker died at age 76 due to complications from pneumonia.

== Biography ==
Born in 1921 in Baltimore City, Maryland, Virginia S. Baker was raised in East Baltimore and lived in Baltimore for her entire life. As a kid, Baker was often known by her nickname Queenie, or sometimes kids in the neighborhood referred to her as "queen of the hill". As an adult, Baker was given more nicknames, such as Queen of Fun, Baltimore's First Lady of Fun, and "Baltimore's oldest kid", which were often used by reporters when Baker was mentioned in newspaper articles.

Baker's father was František Pečinka, a Moravian immigrant from Věchnov. The surname Pečinka is a derivative of pekař – Czech for "baker" which influenced the changing of his name to "Frank Baker". In 1917, Frank married Hattie Jelinek, a Baltimore-native of Czech descent whose parents came from Bykáň and Kateřinky respectively. Until Virginia Baker's father died in 1954, her parents ran a confectionery store in East Baltimore on the corner of Monument Street and Belnord Avenue where Baker spent much of her childhood. She also spent a lot of time roller-skating around the streets of Baltimore and coming up with contests, races, and other games to play with kids in the neighborhood.

Baker's voice has been described as "quintessentially Baltimore" and she was a frequently invited guest on radio shows by disc jockeys that wanted to parody the speech patterns and mannerisms that are common stereotypes of Baltimoreans.

According to a Baltimore Sun article on her life, Baker, who never married or had children, "counted generations of Baltimore youngsters as her own special brood". She had a stroke in 1992 and another in 1995, which led to her retirement from the Department of Recreation and Parks. On July 29, 1998, Virginia Baker died at age 76 due to complications from pneumonia.

== Career ==
During her youth, Virginia Baker volunteered as a playground monitor at the old Patterson Park recreation center. After graduating from Eastern High School in 1940, she was hired to work for the rec center and soon became director of recreation. She was known for the numerous new activities and games she was constantly creating, especially different kinds of contests, in her ongoing efforts to keep city's youth active and engaged. One of her ideas that was copied around the country, was the "Kid Swap Shop", an event where kids were invited to trade their unwanted toys. Another notable creation was something she called the "Fun Wagon", which consisted of a basketball hoop on the back of a small trailer that was filled with toys.

Baker generated much publicity for all of her events and was known for her talent at public relations. Maryland Senator and East Baltimore-native Barbara Mikulski, who previously served on the Baltimore City Council, said Baker made herself well-known to the council members with her frequent fundraising and advocacy efforts. Baker took them into the city neighborhoods and to community events where she had them participate in the same games and activities she planned for the kids, a strategy that, according to Mikulski, strengthened the city's community programs by helping Baker avoid some of obstacles of government bureaucracy.

Baker held various positions in during her 53 years of civil service in Baltimore City. She officially retired in 1995 after having a second stroke.

=== Adventures in Fun ===
Baker is best known for the events and activities she came up with as director of the "Adventures in Fun" office, a City Hall office created specifically for Baker by former Baltimore Mayor William Donald Schaefer. In this position, Baker re-purposed War Memorial Plaza in downtown Baltimore as a recreation center that also doubled as a stage for Schaefer, a widely popular mayor at the time who was elected to four terms in office. Baker's staff were featured several times in newscasts wearing chef's hats as they attempted to fry eggs on the sidewalks of downtown Baltimore during summer heat waves.

Baltimore's annual chicken-clucking contest was also one of Baker's creations that came out of the Office of Adventures in Fun. Baker came up with the idea after seeing someone at work imitate a chicken, and immediately started planning the contest, looking for a date, and securing sponsors, such as fast-food companies, for what turned into a successful annual event.

== Legacy ==
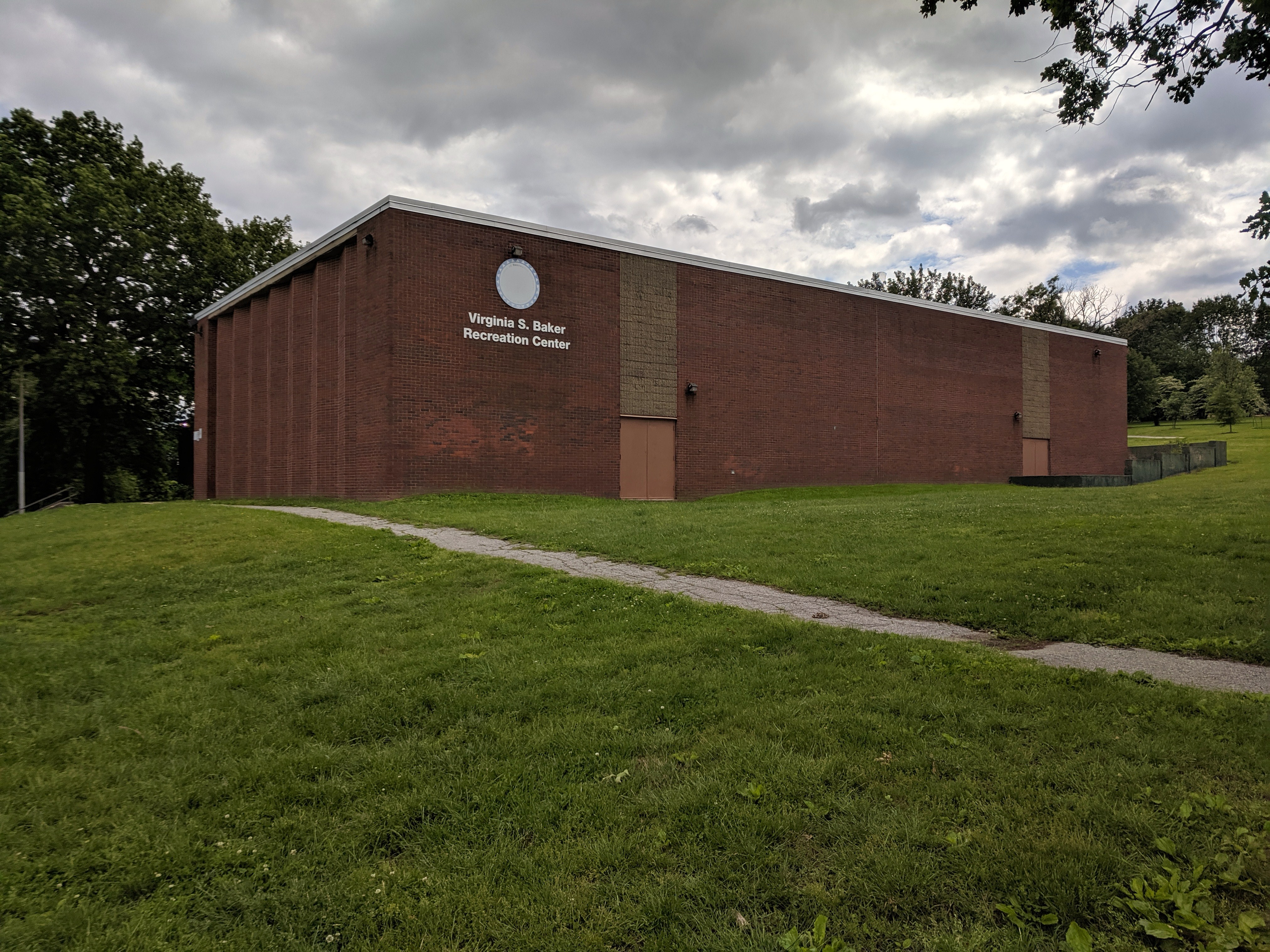
The Virginia S. Baker Recreation Center in Patterson Park, May 2019.

In 1984, the Patterson Park recreation center was named the Virginia S. Baker Recreation Center in recognition of her many years of service to the city's youth. Writer Rafael Alvarez said Baker "deliver[ed] entertainment and exercise to three generations of Baltimoreans" and is "perhaps the only civil servant in America in charge of an office called Adventures in Fun".

When Baker died in 1998, U.S. Senator from Maryland and Baltimore-native Barbara Mikulski paid special tribute to her in an address to the Senate that was printed in the Congressional record. In her address, Mikulski said,

Virginia S. Baker was special to me, my family and the entire city of Baltimore. Virginia Baker started as a volunteer playground monitor in Baltimore, where she brought joy and fun to the city's streets and neighborhoods. But more importantly, she always kept an eagle eye out for the children with a broken heart or the ones from a broken home. Without notice she would find a way to bring those children into her circle of compassion, to let them know they always had a home at her recreation center. She had the special gift of mending children's hearts.

== See also ==
- Mary Dobkin (1902–1987), amateur sports coach and advocate for children from Baltimore City; namesake of the Mary Dobkin Park in Baltimore.
- History of the Czechs in Baltimore
