= Heritage High School (Baltimore, Maryland) =

Former high school in Baltimore, Maryland, U.S.

Coordinates: 39°19′10″N 76°35′5″W

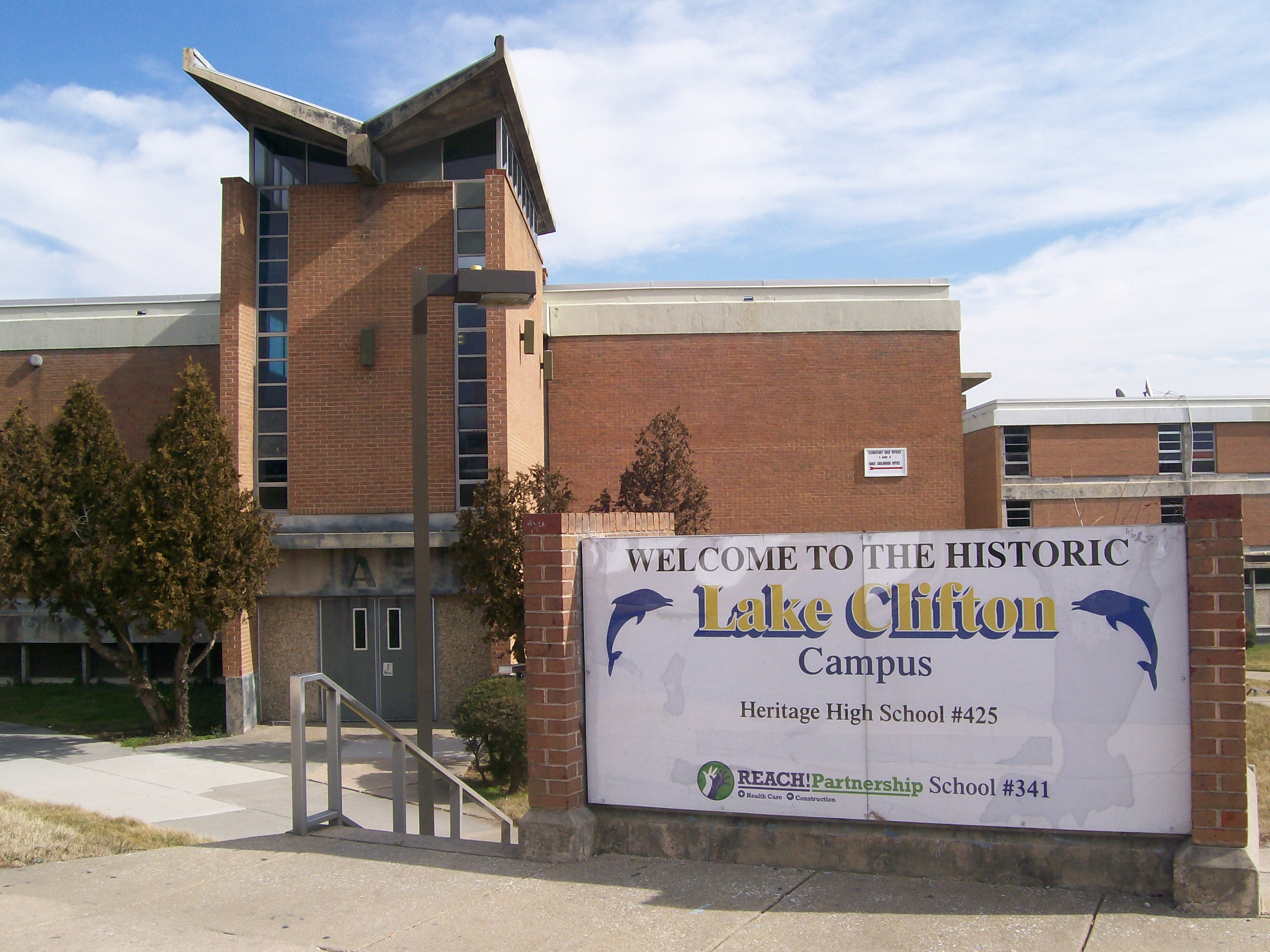

Location
- 2801 Saint Lo Drive; Baltimore, Maryland 21213; United States

Information
- School type: Public, Comprehensive (defunct)
- Motto: Preserving the Past as we Prepare for the Future
- Founded: 2004
- Founder: Karen Lawrence
- Closed: 2015
- School district: Baltimore City Public Schools
- Superintendent: Gregory Thornton [CEO]
- School number: 425
- Principal: Stephanie Farmer
- Grades: Pre-k, 9–12
- Enrollment: 425 (excluding pre-k) (2014)
- Area: Urban
- Colors: Royal Blue, Black, and White
- Mascot: Black Panther
- Team name: Lakers (inherited from Lake Clifton-Eastern High School)/Panthers
- Website: www.baltimorecityschools.org/425

Heritage High School was a public high school housed in the former Lake Clifton-Eastern High School (LCEHS) in the northeast area known as Clifton Park of Baltimore, Maryland. It served Baltimore City high schoolers from 2004 to 2015.

Founded in 2004, established as an expansion school and as a result of the breakup of Lake Clifton-Eastern. It was categorized within District 6, "neighborhood high schools": a comprehensive high school. It officially specialized in the focus of three career and technology completer preparation programs: Business, Management & Finance; Human Resource Services; and Law.

Lake Clifton-Eastern had existed on the campus since the early 1970s until it closed down in 2005, after which its building was occupied by the new smaller schools. These schools were still faced with problems common to underfunded urban schools, such as academic performance and discipline. The same problems led to Doris M. Johnson High School being recommend for closure in 2010 and Heritage was identified by the Maryland State Department of Education for school improvement in many years.

== History ==
Founded in 2004 by Karen Lawrence, established as an expansion school originally known as Harford Institute during the time and as a result of the breakup of Lake Clifton Eastern High School. The school began it existence at the old Fairmount-Harford Building of 2555 Harford Road where it shared the building with Harbor City High School for the first two years (2003–2005) with an initial enrollment of up to 310 9th and 10th graders.

After the following school year, the school was relocated to the Lake Clifton Campus with an initial enrollment of 550 students of grades 9th through 11th for the 2004–2005 school year, where it was the last year of the graduating class and existence of Lake Clifton Eastern High School. This building already had science labs, a state-of the art library & media center, gymnasiums, full-service health clinic, and established athletic and extracurricular activities. It was also wired for internet. Beginning with the 2005–2006 school year, Heritage High School shared the Lake Clifton Campus with Doris M. Johnson High School. Both schools had their first graduating classes of seniors in the year 2006. From 2008 to 2012, Heritage offered Advanced Placement courses.

In 2010, the school system recommended Doris M. Johnson High School for closure due to poor test scores, school climate, and discipline problems. The REACH! Partnership School was relocated to the campus for development and replaced Doris M. Johnson after the closure. REACH! Academy had undergone a renovation of $3.5 million to accommodate lab areas construction and health-care (its themes). Heritage continues career & technology pathways into human resources, business, and leadership, and now also includes law. However, as of 2012–2013, the school no longer offered Advanced Placement. As a cost-cutting measure, Heritage High School was slated for closure at the end of the 2014–2015 school year. The graduation ceremony for the final Class of 2015 was hosted in the Lake Clifton auditorium complex on Saturday May 30, 2015.

== Sports ==
The Lake Clifton Lakers won state championships in 1995, 1999, 2009, 2012.

== Organizations ==
Beginning in 2008, the school offered a pilot course in conjunction with the Baltimore Algebra Project. Their first class was slated to graduate in 2013. Heritage High School had a JROTC program through the United States Army. Real Food Farm, which cultivates crops on the campus, offered internships to Heritage students.

== Students ==
In 2010, 97.5% of students at HHS identified as African-American. The graduation rate was 54.65% (up from 42.15% in 2009 and 47.32% in 2008). The drop-out rate was 5.16% (down from 7.02% in 2009 and 14.01% in 2008).

The average total SAT score in 2009 was 936.
