= Thomas Jordan (basketball) =

American basketball player (born 1968)

Personal information
- Born: May 23, 1968 (age 58) Baltimore, Maryland, U.S.
- Listed height: 6 ft 10 in (2.08 m)
- Listed weight: 220 lb (100 kg)

Career information
- High school: Lake Clifton (Baltimore, Maryland)
- College: Oklahoma State (1988–1989)
- NBA draft: 1989: undrafted
- Playing career: 1988–2003
- Position: Power forward
- Number: 55, 50

Career history
- 1988: Eczacıbaşı SK
- 1989–1990: Atenas Córdoba
- 1990: Deportivo San Andrés
- 1990–1992: A.E.K. Athens
- 1992–1993: Granollers
- 1993: Philadelphia 76ers
- 1993: Gigantes de Carolina
- 1993: Olimpia Milano
- 1993–1994: CB Zaragoza
- 1994: Aguadilla
- 1994–1995: Pagrati
- 1995: Aguadilla
- 1995–1996: Ülkerspor
- 1996: Aguadilla
- 1996: Saski Baskonia
- 1996–1997: Atenas Córdoba
- 1997: Aguadilla
- 1997–1998: Cantabria
- 1998: Cangrejeros de Santurce
- 1998: S.S. Felice Scandone
- 1998–1999: Libertad
- 1999: Brooklyn Kings
- 1999: Mets de Guaynabo
- 1999–2000: Valladolid
- 2000: Gimnasia La Plata
- 2002–2003: Skonto

Career highlights
- Greek League All-Star (1991); Liga Nacional de Básquet rebounding leader (1990)
- Stats at NBA.com
- Stats at Basketball Reference

Thomas Edward Jordan (born May 23, 1968) is an American former professional basketball player, whose club career spanned from 1988 to 2003.

== Early life ==
Jordan was born in Baltimore, Maryland, and attended Lake Clifton High School, where he played for the high school basketball team, averaging 22.0 points and 12.7 rebounds per game during his senior year. He was once ranked the top-rated high school basketball player in the Baltimore area.

In 1987, during his senior year in high school, Jordan infamously walked out in the middle of the Metro Classic Championship game between Lake Clifton, and St. Maria Goretti High School at the Baltimore Arena; Jordan was upset, because his teammates were not passing him the ball. He was taken out of the game with several minutes left in the second quarter, and with his team trailing at halftime, 38–28, he went into the locker room, got dressed into his street clothes, and left the arena to go home. Without Jordan in the second half, Lake Clifton lost the championship game, 73–72, as Rodney Monroe of St. Maria Goretti made a 60-foot shot at the buzzer.

== College career ==
Jordan played college basketball at Oklahoma State University; he was ineligible as a freshman in the 1987–88 season, due to low test scores, and failing to qualify under NCAA Proposition 48 guidelines. In his sophomore year, he averaged 13.8 points, 5.8 rebounds and 1.8 blocks per game, while shooting .586 in field-goal percentage for the Cowboys during the 1988–89 season. Jordan's decision to leave college early to play professionally was due to a lack of team chemistry.

Jordan said that he never "enjoyed" basketball, he only "played it." He used the sport as a means to get a free college education, and any desires of playing professionally was not necessarily his goal. In October 1988, Jordan told The Oklahoman newspaper:

"I don't like basketball; I just play it. It's a vehicle for a free ride (college scholarship). If the air blew up the ball, I'm not going to cry. Don't get me wrong, I won't turn down a pro career if that comes, but I'm not counting on it."

== Professional career ==
After his sophomore year of college, Jordan began a pro club career. He played professionally for 14 years, in six countries, which included time spent playing in the National Basketball Association. In April 1993, Jordan was signed as a free agent by the Philadelphia 76ers, who signed him to a 10-day contract; he played in the final four games of the 1992–93 NBA season, averaging 11.0 points, 4.8 rebounds, and 1.3 blocks per game off the bench as the team's sixth man.

Jordan was also a free agent in the Minnesota Timberwolves' training camp prior to the 1993–94 NBA season, but did not play for them. In the 1994 off-season, he played for the New York Knicks in the Doral Arrowwood Summer League, before returning to play overseas until his retirement in 2003.

== Personal life ==
Jordan has a younger brother named Alexander Mobley, who also played basketball; Mobley attended Dunbar High School in Washington D.C., and played college basketball at the University of Maryland Eastern Shore.
