= Elsie Shutt =

American computer programmer and entrepreneur (born 1928)

- Born: Elsie Goedeke; 1928 (age 97–98); New York City, New York, U.S.
- Education: Goucher College (BA); Harvard University (attended)
- Occupation: Technology entrepreneur

Elsie Shutt (née Goedeke, born 1928) is a pioneering American programmer and technological entrepreneur. Born in New York City, she was raised in Baltimore, Maryland. Although Shutt attributes her learning to her mother’s academic path and Baltimore’s education-forward school system, the logic-based aspects of math and science were what fascinated her. She went on to study math at Goucher College — at the time, all-women’s college offering a premier education — in hopes of teaching math at the college level.

Shutt’s first exposure to the ENIAC computer was at a job interview at Aberdeen Proving Grounds. There, the United States government was hiring female math majors to aid the war effort. This is where Shutt’s interest in programming began. However, she soon received a Pepsi-Cola graduate fellowship, enabling her to continue her studies at Radcliffe College of Harvard University. Shutt was the second woman to earn a teaching fellowship in Radcliffe's math department. However, she taught in a segregated higher-education system where women were barred from teaching men. While the male fellows taught calculus, Shutt was relegated to instructing entry-level classes. Despite this, Shutt soon taught the singular calculus at Radcliffe, and went on to teach a trigonometry course to male Harvard students.

In the summers, Shutt worked at Aberdeen programming the ORDVAC computer. Here, she met Richard Clippinger, who hired her at Raytheon. Together with Honeywell, Raytheon was developing a computer that would later be known as the Datamatic 1000. In the meantime, programmers like Shutt performed computing services for external customers. Working on a flood control program for the Army Corps of Engineers, Shutt programmed on the Univac computer. She would go on to program on IBM mainframes.

In 1957, Shutt, married and expecting her first child, left her work at Raytheon. After all, many companies refused to employ women part-time. However, Raytheon was phasing out computing services for external clients. Shutt found part-time work continuing to program for these former clients. She soon landed a contract working on a new operating system for Honeywell’s mainframe. However, this was too big a job for one freelancer; the answer, Shutt believed, was incorporating. In 1958, Shutt, alongside fellow programmers Irma Wyman, Elaine Kamowitz, and Barbara Wade, founded Computations Incorporated, or CompInc. Like Shutt, Kamowitz and Wade were mothers of young children seeking enriching, part-time work. CompInc was staffed entirely by these women, and was one of the first software companies in the world. It sought to give skilled, experienced female programmers the part-time work that the industry did not allow for. Without opportunities to work, young mothers were less able to keep pace in the evolving field of computer programming, making it difficult for them to return to the workforce. CompInc’s mission addressed this inequity, allowing women to manage their personal and family life whilst continue developing their skills. The corporation was very successful; clients included the United States government, the Army Corps of Engineers, and the United States Space Program.

In the 1970s, computer programming experienced a lull. In response, CompInc pivoted to focus on programming for business applications, such as sending transcripts for Dean Junior College. Programming whenever work was available, Shutt led CompInc for over 45 years, emphasizing her staff’s pride in their work. Despite the development of programming into a male-dominated field, the company has helped over fifty women launch careers in technology. Shutt continues to describe computer programming as “fascinating” work. She strongly encourages interested young women to pursue an education that will lead them into the world of programming.

== Early life and education ==
Elsie Shutt was born Elsie Goedeke in New York City. She was raised in Baltimore, Maryland by her mother and maternal grandfather. Her father died when she was four years old.

She attended Eastern High School in Baltimore and graduated at the age of 16. At the age of 20, she graduated from Goucher College as a math major with a minor in chemistry. After receiving a Pepsi-Cola fellowship for graduate school, covering full tuition and partial living expenses, she continued her math studies at Radcliffe College of Harvard University.

== Career ==
Shutt learnt to program on the Electronic Numerical Integrator and Computer (ENIAC) under Dick Clippinger during a summer job at the U.S. Army's Aberdeen Proving Ground in Maryland. In 1953, Shutt was hired at Raytheon, an aerospace and defense manufacturing company, where she worked on software for the Raycom computer.

In 1957, Shutt married and had a baby. She subsequently left her job. She worked as a freelance programmer from her home, and in 1958 she founded Computations Incorporated.

Shutt's founding of Computations Incorporated (CompInc) was a development for gender equality in computer science–a historically male-dominated field. According to Janet Abbate, author of Recoding Gender: Women's Changing Participation in Computing, Shutt was among the early pioneers who showed that women could work in programming and systems analysis while also managing family responsibilities.

CompInc created software solutions for major clients such as Raytheon and the U.S. Air Force. Shutt led CompInc for more than 45 years. She frequently employed women who sought flexible programming jobs to balance family responsibilities. CompInc also offered additional training programs to employees with limited experience. The company provided systems analysis and design, along with programming help, for primary clients.

CompInc emphasized “desk-checking” between employees, during which they reviewed each other's code. At its peak, the company entered into contracts with Minneapolis-Honeywell, Raytheon, St. Regis Paper Co., Harvard University, The University of Rochester, and the United States Air Force.

Shutt later commented that “It really amazed me that these men were programmers, because I thought it was women's work!”
