= Clifton Park, Baltimore =

Park and historic district in Maryland, US

- Clifton Park
- U.S. National Register of Historic Places
- U.S. Historic district
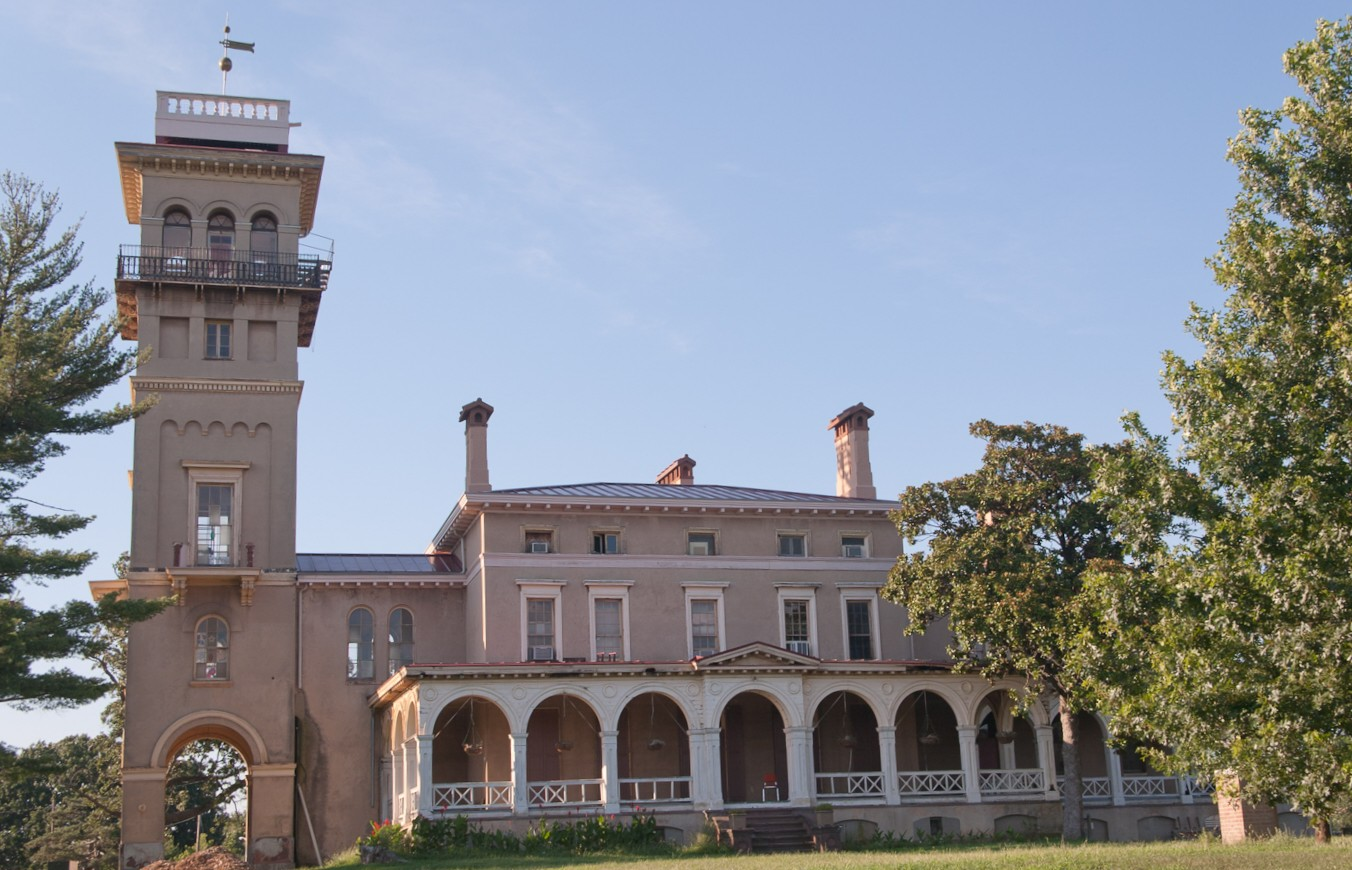
- "Clifton Mansion", original home of Capt. Henry Thompson, (1774–1837), later purchased 1838 by Johns Hopkins, (1795–1873), renovated/redesigned around 1858 by architectural team of Niernsee and Neilson, photo taken August 2011

- Location within Baltimore Location within Maryland Location within the United States
- Location: Bounded by Harford Rd., Erdman Ave., Clifton Park Terrace, the Baltimore Belt RR and Sinclair Ln., Baltimore, Maryland
- Coordinates: 39°19′15″N 76°34′58″W
- Area: 266.7 acres (107.9 ha)
- Built: 1801
- Architect: Niersee & Neilson; Wyatt and Nolting; Olmsted Brothers; Thomas, Frederick
- Architectural style: Italian Villa, Gothic Revival, Late 19th & 20th C. Revival
- NRHP reference No.: 07000941
- Added to NRHP: September 12, 2007

Clifton Park is a public urban park and national historic district located between the Coldstream-Homestead-Montebello and Waverly neighborhoods to the west and the Belair-Edison, Lauraville, Hamilton communities to the north in the northeast section of Baltimore, Maryland, United States. It is roughly bordered by Erdman Avenue (Md. Rt. 151) to the northeast, Sinclair Lane to the south, Harford Road (Md. Rt. 147) to the northwest and Belair Road (U.S. Route 1) to the southeast. The eighteen-hole Clifton Park Golf Course, which is the site of the annual Clifton Park Golf Tournament, occupies the north side of the park.

== History ==
=== Thompson years (1803–1837) ===
The land on which Clifton Park sits was once farmland. Built around 1803, the home was originally the summer residence of Capt. Henry Thompson, (1774–1837). Born in Sheffield, England, he came to Baltimore around 1794, and soon became a prominent figure in the newly emerging city as a merchant, financier, and company director. Thompson was public-spirited and used his knowledge of horses in military matters to serve as a cavalry officer in the Maryland State Militia's "Baltimore Light Dragoons", which he joined in 1809 and was elected captain. He later organized the "First Baltimore Horse Artillery" in 1813, which defended Baltimore during the British attack during the War of 1812 at the Battle of Baltimore, the bombardment of Fort McHenry (which inspired the writing of the Star Spangled Banner), the Battle of North Point, and the stand-off at what is now known as Patterson Park in East Baltimore, on September 12-13-14, 1814. Prior to seeing action in Baltimore, he was assigned by Brig. Gen. John Stricker, commander of the Third Brigade (also known as the Baltimore City Brigade) of the Maryland State Militia, to carry messages between Bladensburg, Maryland, and the nearby national capital in Washington, D.C., during the first phase of the Battle of Bladensburg, which preceded the Burning of Washington during the Chesapeake Bay campaign in August 1814. Later he and his mounted unit served as the personal bodyguard of Maj. Gen. Samuel Smith, overall commander of the State Militia under then-Maryland governor Levin Winder, and the various militia forces from surrounding counties and states, including several regular army and navy units and detachments defending Baltimore in September 1814.

Later in private and business life, Thompson served as president of the Baltimore and Harford Turnpike Company which began building the northeastern spoke road out of the city, now known as Harford Road (Md. Rt. 147). Later he was part of the Poppleton Commission under city surveyor and mapmaker Thomas Poppleton which laid out additional grids of streets and blocks for the city's future expansion and prepared a well-known map and diagram of the new sections and the larger city in 1818, resulting in the first major large scale annexation of the territory around the City known as "The Precincts" from surrounding rural Baltimore County, that year. He also served as member of the boards of directors of the Baltimore and Port Deposit Railroad, the third major Baltimore railroad chartered in Maryland and one of the first in America, (later merged with several other smaller connecting lines into the Philadelphia, Wilmington and Baltimore Railroad – eventually into the dominant northeast line, the Pennsylvania Railroad by 1881), the Bank of Baltimore – second financial institution in the city, the landmark domed Merchants' Exchange Building, (largest magnificent structure then in America – designed by famed architect Benjamin Henry Latrobe, 1815–1820), (at East Lombard, Water and South Gay Streets), the Baltimore Board of Trade, and the Maryland Agricultural Society. He was honored with the position of being Marshall of the Proceedings at the Cornerstone-Laying for both the Battle Monument, (on North Calvert Street, between East Fayette and Lexington Streets), on the first Defenders' Day anniversary of the engagement, September 12, 1815, and the iconic Washington Monument earlier on "Independence Day", July 4, 1815, on a prominence in "Howard's Woods" just north then of the developed city. In later years, Thompson also served as the Grand Marshall of the festivities in Baltimore surrounding the return and the touring visit to America of the French patriot and American supporter, Marquis de Lafayette, former aide to commanding General George Washington and also General in our Continental Army during the American Revolutionary War in 1824. Thompson maintained ownership of the Clifton estate until about 1835, dying two years later in 1837.

=== Hopkins years (1838–1894) ===
In 1838, Clifton was bought by local merchant, financier, and philanthropist Johns Hopkins (1795–1873), for his estate and was later developed with a nearby lake and a large sculpture collection. In 1858, the present Italianate-style Clifton Mansion with its prominent tower was built (pictured), designed by architects John Rudolph Niernsee and James Crawford Neilson.

Hopkins originally intended to locate the campus of his planned Johns Hopkins University on the Clifton property. However, Hopkins died before his vision for a university could be realized. Instead, a downtown location in Baltimore's Mount Vernon-Belvedere neighborhood was chosen by Daniel Coit Gilman, the university's first president.

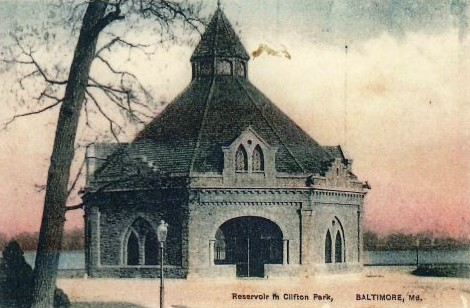
Postcard depicting the Lake Clifton valve house in 1888

Even before the city purchased the old Thompson/Hopkins estate from the Johns Hopkins University Board of Trustees, a portion of the land was used for development of a reservoir for the area's municipal water supply system. Called Lake Clifton, the 30 acre reservoir was 30 feet deep and had a capacity of 265 million gallons of water when it was completed and put into service on December 27, 1888. Related to the reservoir's operation, the Clifton Park Valve House was completed in 1887 to regulate the flow of water into adjacent Lake Clifton. The valve house is an 8-sided distinctive stone structure with a cone tile roof and stained glass windows. It had eight valves controlling water entering through a large tunnel. Although the valve house still stands, it is in a dilapidated condition and the stained glass windows were destroyed by vandals sometime in the 1970s.

=== City of Baltimore ownership (1894–present) ===
In 1894, Johns Hopkins University sold its unused "Clifton" estate to Baltimore City for use as a park in the city's northeast section, adding to the city's growing parks system.

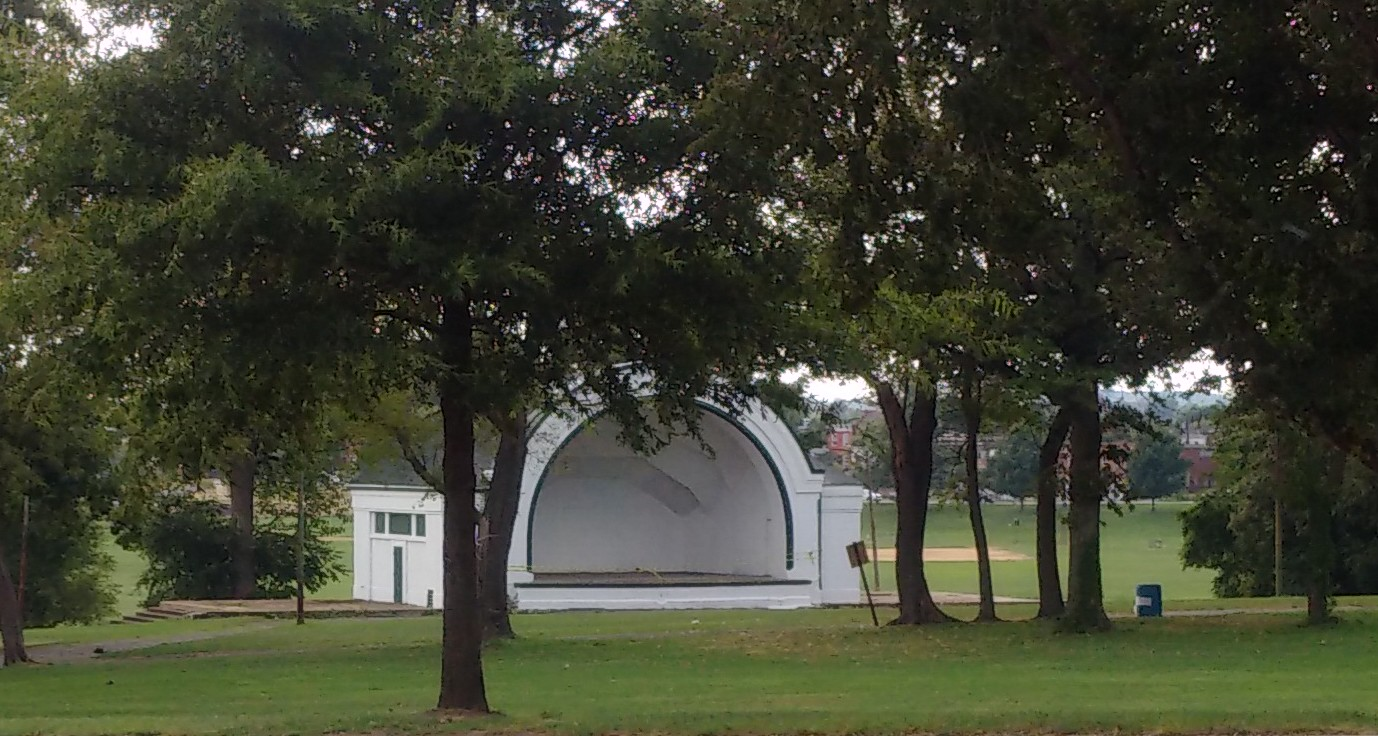
Band shell at Clifton Park

Development of the park included construction of a band shell, where outdoor concerts were popular in the 1920s–1930s. The #19 streetcar line ran on a dedicated right-of-way along Clifton Park's Harford Road border until 1956.

Clifton Park became the central area where Maryland National Guard troops were moved in and out of Baltimore during the riots of April 1968 centering in the Jonestown/Old Town commercial district and surrounding rowhouse residential neighborhood along North Gay Street, following the assassination of the Rev. Dr. Martin Luther King Jr. It was there that the troops camped out during their mission. They guarded the streets against looting during the day and slept at the Park during the night hours. Dallas Arthur, a Maryland National Guard soldier, describes the situation as intense when he relates to roadblocks posted near Clifton Park.

== Amenities ==
Part of the estate has been a municipal golf course since 1915, the first public course in Baltimore. The old Clifton Mansion was used as the course's pro shop for many years, along with offices for the Baltimore City Department of Recreation and Parks. With the completion of a $7 million renovation to the Clifton Mansion in 2019, it is now used as the headquarters of a local service-based nonprofit, Civic Works.

In 1916, Peabody Institute trustees gave Baltimore City "On the Trail," a 7-foot-4 bronze sculpture of a Native American man created by local artist/sculptor Edward Berge, placed upon a boulder in Clifton Park. The statue is reported to have been generally overlooked by those visiting the park, though it has been subjected to periodic vandalism.

St. Vincent de Paul Roman Catholic Church, now located in the eastern downtown neighborhood of Jonestown about three miles southwest of Clifton Park, had its old cemetery southeast of the park, bordering the golf course. Still owned by the Church, it is a seven-acre burial ground for about two thousand parishioners of mostly Irish, German, and Italian descent dating back to the mid-19th century. Heavily hit by vandalism during the 1960s, it was officially closed in the early 1980s and fell into disrepair. Cleanup and maintenance of the cemetery began again in mid-2010 under a newly established supporters and watchdog group, the Friends of St Vincent's Cemetery.

Lake Clifton was drained in the late 1960s for development of Lake Clifton High School, (now referred to as the "Lake Clifton Campus"). It was opened in September 1971, built in a distinctive modernistic architecture. It is the largest school campus in physical size in the Baltimore City Public Schools system and one of the most massive and most expensive in the country built up to that time. Built in response to relieve the long-time overcrowding resulting from the post-World War II "baby boom" of the 1950s-60s, Lake Clifton however seemed troubled from the start and had problems extending through its first decade of service from the early 1970s into the 1980s. The all-girls secondary school of Eastern High School (founded 1844), after its unfortunate 1984 closure of its landmark 1938 Jacobethan/English Tudor-style H-shaped, red-brick building with limestone trim, to the northeast on East 33rd Street and Loch Raven Boulevard (opposite Memorial Stadium) was later merged with the Lake Clifton High School in response to protests from its students, faculty, alumni and many of the surrounding community, because of the increasing amount of deferred maintenance needed on the then half-century-old structure and also by that decade, student population in the city public schools was dropping and an agency determined that one of the city's then almost 25 high schools should be closed. For a number of years, the school was then known as "Lake Clifton-Eastern High School" as a historic continuation of the former long-time premier girls school. After another reorganization of the B.C.P.S. and the rearrangement of several schools in the northeast sector of the city, the institution became known as the "Lake Clifton Campus" currently comprises two small schools: Heritage High School and the REACH! Partnership School. (Note: Civic Works, Inc. is the operator and CEO managing the REACH! Partnership School. More information about the schools can be found on the official websites about the schools.)

Clifton Park is also home to "Real Food Farm", a 6-acre urban sustainable farm managed by Civic Works, Inc. that was started in 2009. The farm aims to increase food access in the neighborhoods around the park, demonstrate the economic potential of urban farming, and provides experiential education opportunities to the students from Heritage, REACH! and other public city schools. (Note: Real Food Farm is adjacent to the athletic fields. Additional references and information can be found on the webpage "About – in the news" and the "Official website of Real Food Farm". Information relating to Real Food Farm can be found on Lake Clifton Eastern High School article.)

Clifton Park was listed on the National Register of Historic Places in 2007.
