= New Era Academy =

Location
- 2700 Seamon Avenue; Baltimore, Maryland 21225; United States; 39°15′13″N 76°37′14″W

Information
- School type: Public, Charter (formerly/similar)
- Founded: 2003
- Closed: 2023
- School district: Baltimore City Public Schools
- Grades: 6–12
- Campus type: Urban
- Colors: Maroon and Black
- Mascot: Jaguar
- Nickname: New Era Academy Jaguars

New Era Academy was a public secondary school serving grades 6 to 12, located in the Cherry Hill neighborhood of South Baltimore, Maryland, United States. It was operated as an "innovation high school" by Replications, Inc. for the Baltimore City Public School System.

The school opened in 2003, serving students citywide.

The Baltimore City Public Schools board voted to close New Era Academy citing low enrollment numbers and deteriorating infrastructure were some of the factors that led to the decision, the school was closed at the end of the 2023 school year.
