= Maryland School for the Blind =

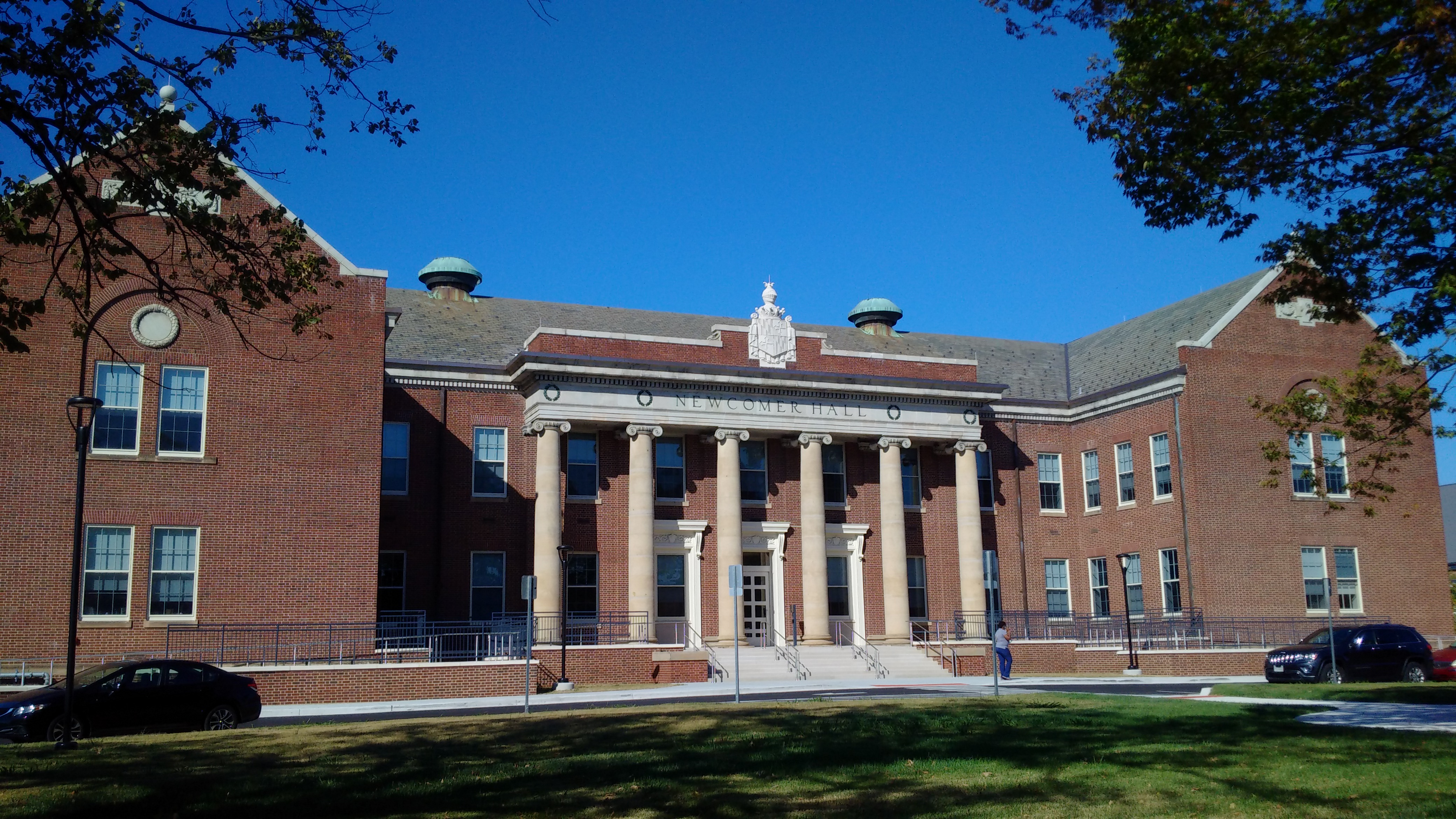
- Newcomer Hall, built 1909

Location
- 3501 Taylor Avenue; Baltimore, Maryland 21236; United States; 39°22′3″N 76°32′10″W

Information
- School type: Private, special needs (visually impaired)
- Established: 1853; 173 years ago
- President: W. Robert Hair
- Chairman: Marion Mullauer
- Gender: Co-ed
- Age range: 3–21
- Enrollment: 220 (4/30/2019)
- Website: MSB Website

The Maryland School for the Blind (MSB) is a school in Baltimore for children and youth who are blind or Low-vision, including those with multiple disabilities.

MSB is a non-profit, private, statewide resource center providing outreach, educational and residential programs. Over 65% of the 2,000 students identified in Maryland as blind or visually impaired are served by the school every year.

== On Campus Programs ==
=== Early Learning Program ===
The Early Learning Program provides instruction for children with visual impairment ages birth to five years, within two programs; Infants & Toddlers, and the center-based programs including both Preschool and Kindergarten.

The Preschool and Kindergarten program serves children, ages three through five years of age. The purpose of the program is to promote readiness for school-age programs in the most integrative setting possible. Typically developing students, without disabilities, are enrolled in each class and are integral to providing an engaging and challenging early learning program for all students. Activities and materials from the curriculum are modified to meet the Maryland Early Learning Standards and support the development and learning of typical peers alongside blind and low-vision students. The program is licensed through the Office of Child Care.

=== Academic Program ===
MSB Academic Programs serve students who are on an academic diploma track. Students also receive direct instruction in functional academic skills as well as in the areas of the Expanded Core Curriculum for students who are blind or visually impaired. The program is designed to address specific skill needs of students, address learning issues and facilitate a successful return to their local school system. The General Academic Program follows an academic curriculum based on the Maryland College and Career Ready Standards.

For students who are not on a diploma track, MSB provides tailored programs to meet their educational and social needs. Vocational training is emphasized. Academic instruction is presented at a student's instructional level and is based on significantly modified content standards. Students also receive instruction in the content areas of the expanded core curriculum for blind and low-vision learners. For students with severe and profound disabilities, academic programs often have an emphasis on functional life skills, including communication, and a strong multi-sensory approach to learning.

The Unique Learning System based on Common Core standards is used. Students also receive instruction in content areas of the expanded core curriculum for blind and low-vision learners. The educational program takes into consideration the complex health and physical needs of each student while developing age-appropriate adaptive skills to increase independence. This program also includes students with dual sensory impairments of both hearing and vision.

== Athletics ==
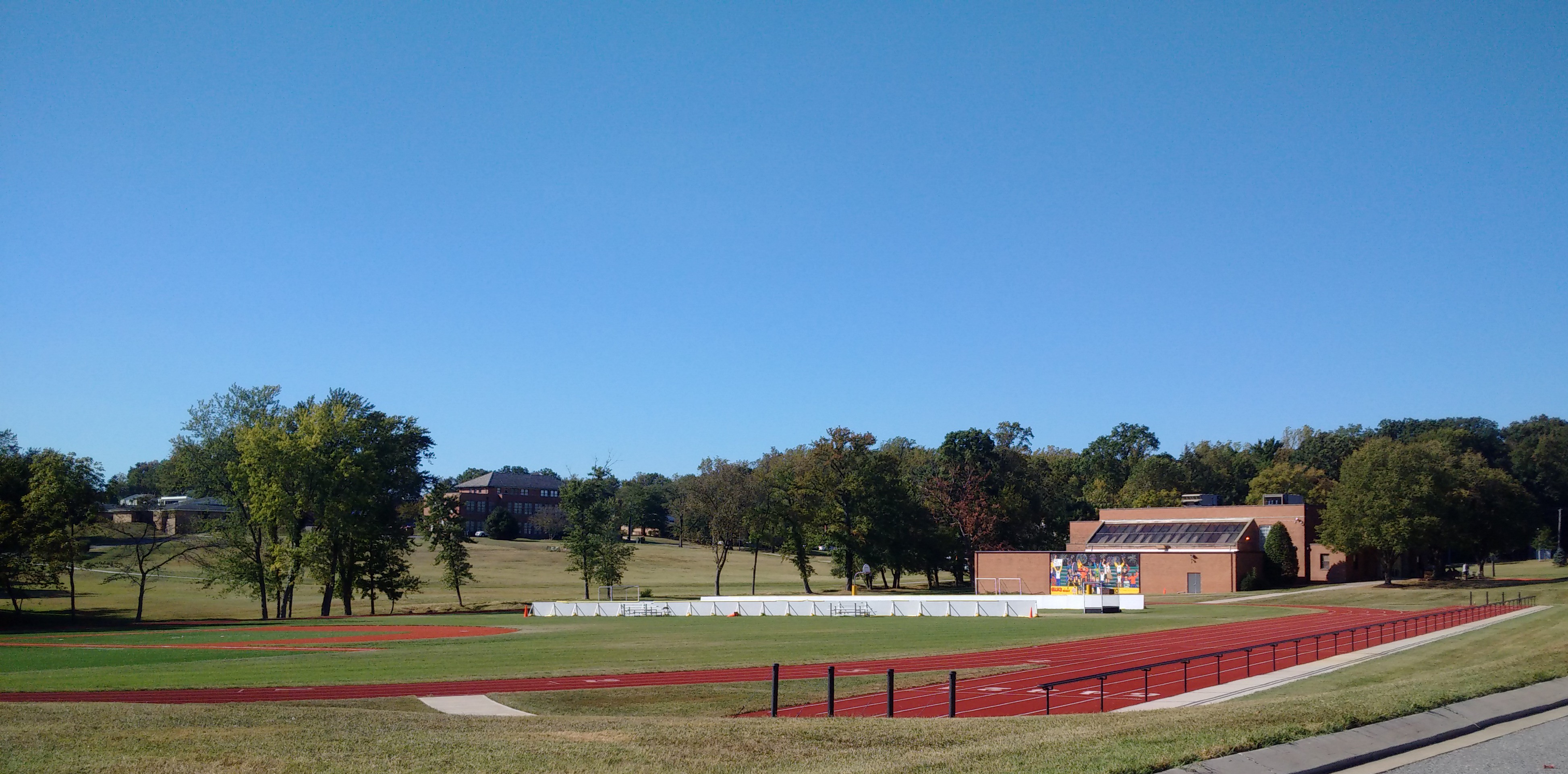
Athletics field and gymnasium at the school

MSB offers wrestling, track and field, and goalball (a Paralympic sport for the blind). In 2019, MSB began soccer as a varsity sport on a specially designed field with kickboards on the sidelines to keep the ball in play. The game is further adapted for the visually impaired by having the ball weighted with ball bearings to produce a jingling sound the players can hear. They must shout "voy" to alert other players to their location. Only the goalie is sighted.

MSB began developing blind soccer in 2017, hosting the first North American Blind Soccer Training Camp in 2018. After two years of training and practice, MSB played the first actual game against the Virginia School for the Deaf and the Blind, on September 24, 2019. Players on the Maryland team, the "Bees", said afterward that they enjoyed the camaraderie, sportsmanship, and fun playing soccer.

== Residency ==
MSB is a co-ed day and residential school located on a 95-acre campus in northeast Baltimore. The campus includes academic, residential, and recreational facilities for students who are blind, low-vision, and multiply-disabled. The dorms at MSB are called “cottages”. Each cottage houses six to eight students and consists of bedrooms with 2 beds and a bathroom in each. Each student typically has a roommate. The common area consists of a living room, dining room, and kitchen. The cottages are occupied and supervised by residential staff members including child and youth care specialists who assist the students with daily living routines. Approximately one-half of the enrolled students live on campus during the school week, while the other half are day students who commute to and from the school on a daily basis.

State Wide Programs:
