= Clifton Park Valve House =

Historic building in Baltimore, Maryland, US

- U.S. National Register of Historic Places
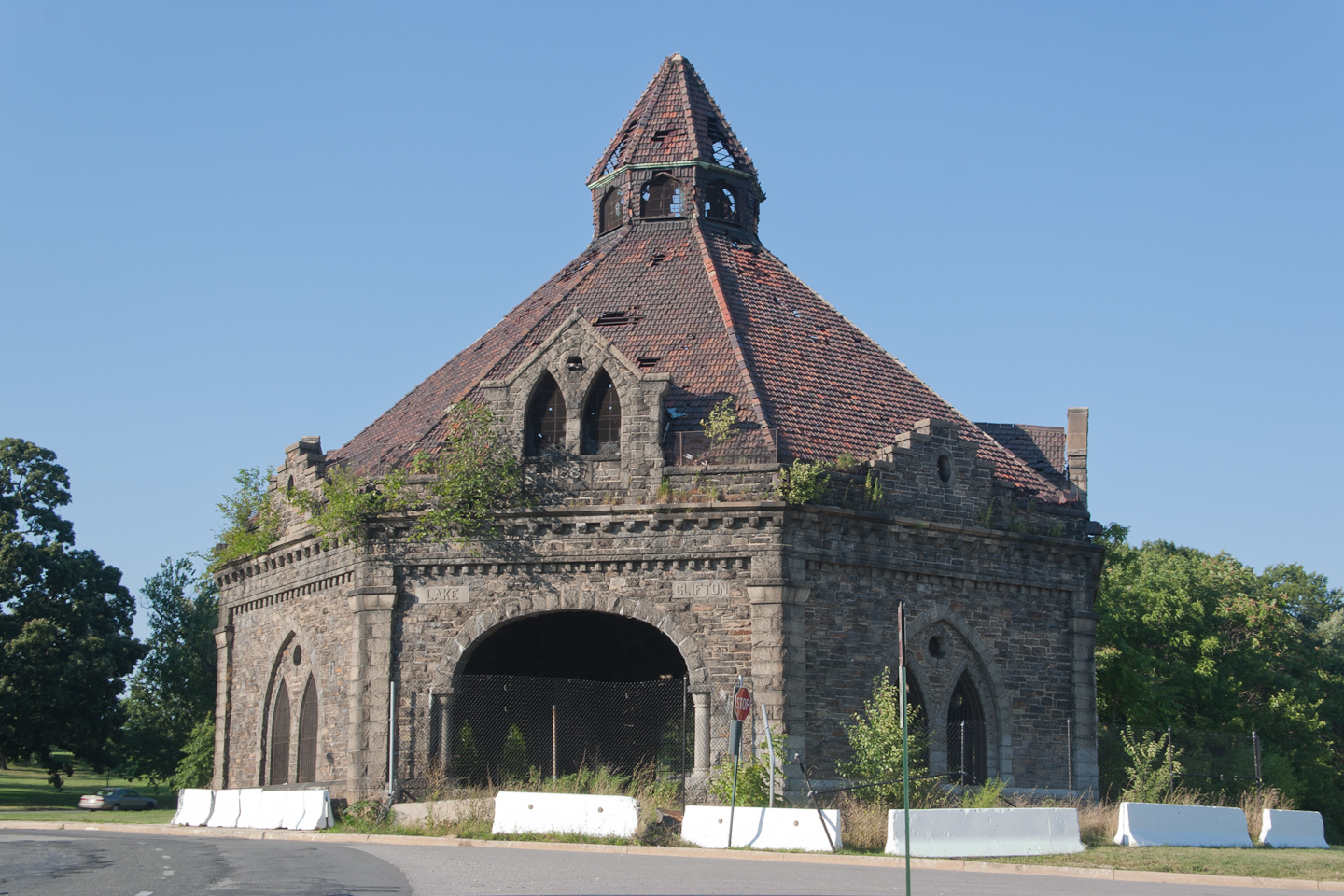
- Clifton Park Valve House, August 2011

- Location within Baltimore Location within Maryland Location within the United States
- Location: 2803 Saint Lo Drive, Baltimore, Maryland
- Coordinates: 39°19′9″N 76°35′13″W
- Area: 9.9 acres (4.0 ha)
- Built: 1887
- Built by: Baltimore City Water Department
- NRHP reference No.: 71001034
- Added to NRHP: February 18, 1971

Clifton Park Valve House, also known as the Lake Clifton Gate House or Lake Clifton Valve House, is a historic building located in a northeast area known as Clifton Park of Baltimore, Maryland. It is a massive octagonal stone gatehouse featuring large Romanesque archways that alternate with Gothic style windows that once contained stained glass. It was constructed in 1887 by the Baltimore City Water Department. It also features a turret, atop an intricate tile roof supported by a complicated system of iron trusses.

Clifton Park Valve House was listed on the National Register of Historic Places in 1971. In 2014, Preservation Maryland placed Clifton Park Valve House on its list of threatened historic properties.
