= Věchnov =

- Municipality
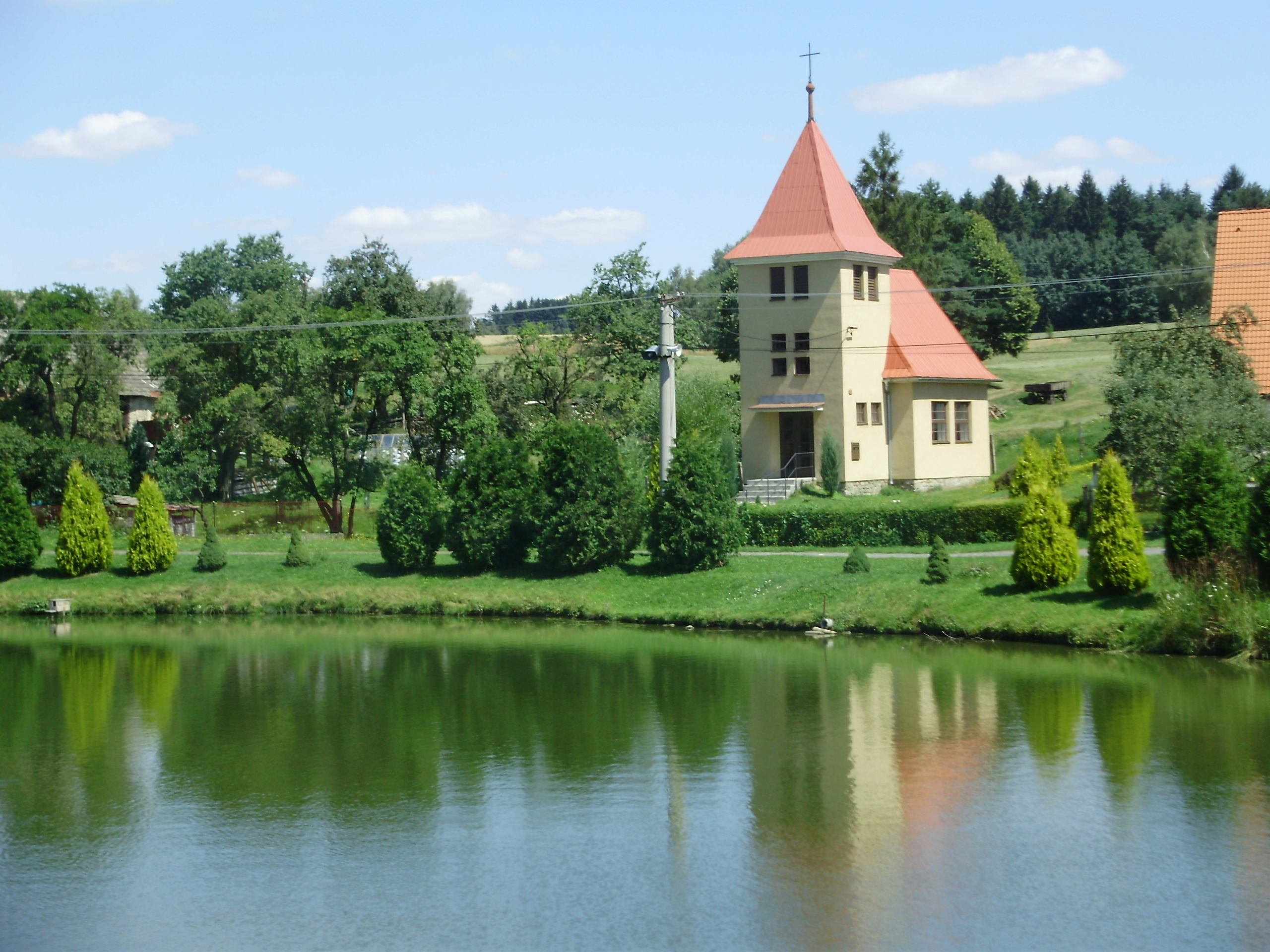
- Chapel of Saint Anthony of Padua

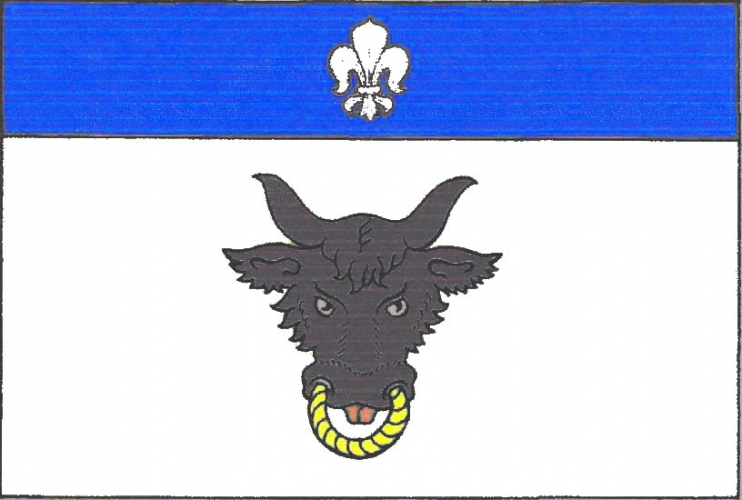
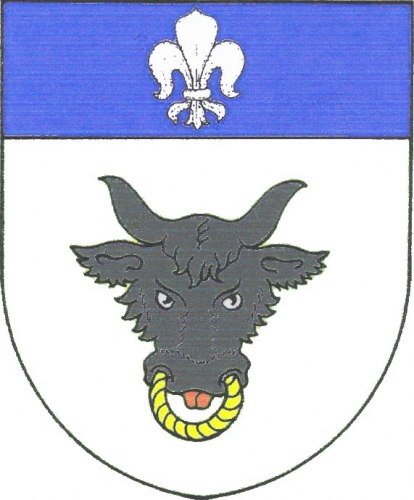
- Flag Coat of arms

- Location in the Czech Republic
- Coordinates: 49°29′58″N 16°16′44″E
- Country: Czech Republic
- Region: Vysočina
- District: Žďár nad Sázavou
- First mentioned: 1325

Area
  - Total: 6.82 km^{2} (2.63 sq mi)
- Elevation: 576 m (1,890 ft)

Population (2026-01-01)
  - Total: 321
  - Density: 47.1/km^{2} (122/sq mi)
- Time zone: UTC+1 (CET)
  - Summer (DST): UTC+2 (CEST)
- Postal code: 593 01
- Website: www.obecvechnov.cz

Věchnov is a municipality and village in Žďár nad Sázavou District in the Vysočina Region of the Czech Republic. It has about 300 inhabitants.

Věchnov lies approximately 26 kilometres (16 mi) east of Žďár nad Sázavou, 52 km (32 mi) east of Jihlava, and 149 km (93 mi) south-east of Prague.

== Demographics ==
Historical population
Year	Pop.	±%
1869	499	—
1880	481	−3.6%
1890	463	−3.7%
1900	451	−2.6%
1910	457	+1.3%
1921	411	−10.1%
1930	377	−8.3%
1950	329	−12.7%
1961	339	+3.0%
1970	321	−5.3%
1980	314	−2.2%
1991	335	+6.7%
2001	310	−7.5%
2011	321	+3.5%
2021	311	−3.1%
Source: Censuses
