= Lake Clifton Campus =

Defunct school in Baltimore, Maryland, U.S.

Coordinates: 39°19′10″N 76°35′5″W

Lake Clifton-Eastern High School
- Exterior view (October 2019)

Location
- 2801 Saint Lo Drive; Baltimore, Maryland 21213; United States

Information
- School type: Public, Comprehensive (defunct)
- Motto: "We Learn from Today, We Experience Yesterday, We Hope for Tomorrow!"
- Founded: 1970
- Closed: 2005
- Sister school: Eastern High School
- School district: Baltimore City Public Schools
- School number: 40
- Grades: 9–12
- Enrollment: approx. 2,300 (2003)
- Area: Urban
- Colors: Blue, Gold, Green
- Slogan: Home of the Lakers
- Mascot: Dolphin
- Team name: Lakers

Lake Clifton Campus

General information
- Status: Demolished
- Completed: September 1971
- Opening: 2004–2006
- Closed: August 2020 (Note: Doris M. Johnson High School closed in 2011, followed by Heritage High School in 2015.)
- Demolished: January–August 2026
- Owner: Morgan State University

Lake Clifton-Eastern High School (LCEHS) was a public high school, located in the Clifton Park area of northeast Baltimore, Maryland. Originally called Lake Clifton High School (LCHS), the name was commonly shortened to Lake Clifton-Eastern or Lake Clifton.

Along with Walbrook and Southwestern High Schools, LCHS was constructed in between 1970 to 1971, and opened in September 1971, named after and is on the former site of the Lake Clifton Reservoir, and the Clifton Park neighborhood where it was located. Designed during the post-World War II "Baby Boom" years of the 1960s to relieve overcrowding in the city's public high schools, particularly nearby Baltimore City College (City HS), the third oldest public high school in America (founded 1839), and Eastern High School (EHS). Each had about 4,000 students, twice their maximum capacity.

In 1986, with the closure of EHS, the two schools merged and LCHS was renamed Lake Clifton-Eastern High School. However, after the 2004–2005 school year, LCEHS also closed due to declining school enrollment. Two smaller secondary schools, Heritage High School and the REACH! Partnership School, subsequently used the campus, leading to its unified rebranding to Lake Clifton Campus (LCC).

In August 2020, the City of Baltimore officially shut down the buildings. In 2022, the City sold the property to Morgan State University for redevelopment. As of August 2026, Morgan had demolished the school complex, and is planning to redevelop the site into a satellite campus.

== Overview ==
=== Building layout ===
The campus had a central core containing main offices, a 1,000-seat auditorium, two cafeterias, two gymnasiums, a swimming pool, main library & media center, and other administrative offices. This core was connected by bridges and passageways to two buildings, each containing a common area radiating to two distinct smaller units housing classrooms on four levels. The units are referred to as A, B, C, and D units; A and B units are connected on the left side of the central core and C and D units on the right side. As of 2010, Heritage High School utilized the A & B unit side, and the REACH! Partnership School utilized the C & D side of the campus, which was formerly used by Doris M. Johnson High School.

=== Outside area ===
The campus included an athletic sports field, a track and field area, and a tennis area which can also be used for badminton. Additionally, there is a 6-acre (2.4 ha) sustainable agriculture urban farm, "Real Food Farm", which is managed by Civic Works, Inc. The farm had several "hoop houses", tunnel-greenhouses, that were created in 2009 in order to increase food access in local neighborhoods, as well as demonstrating the economic potential of agriculture and environmental urban farming and providing educational opportunities.

== History ==
=== Background ===
Lake Clifton was a man-made, 30-acre (12 ha) reservoir, which was completed on December 27, 1888. The reservoir was 30 feet deep and had a capacity of 265 million US gallons (1.00×10^{9} L) of water. The Lake Clifton Reservoir was built because the neighboring Lake Montebello could no longer handle Baltimore's growing water demand.

=== 1968–1998: Development, opening, and early years ===
The reservoir was drained in 1968, and became the site for the construction of Lake Clifton High School in between 1970 and 1971. At the time of its construction, the school's property area of 441.11 acres (178.51 ha) made it the largest physical plant high school on the East Coast of the United States. In Lake Clifton's 2002 yearbook, it states that LCEHS "was [in the early 70s], and perhaps remains, the largest physical plant high school in the nation." The cost of constructing and equipping LCHS was approximately $17 million in 1970, which adjusting for inflation, would be approximately $99,258,764.27 in 2010. The school was designed to hold 4,800 students.

In the 1985–1986 school year, Eastern High School merged with Lake Clifton High School, and to reflect this, the Baltimore City School Board changed the school's name to Lake Clifton-Eastern High School. In 1995, the school became a pilot high school for the Sylvan Learning Center, reconfiguring its curriculum as a result. From 1995 to 2003, Lake Clifton-Eastern consisted of six smaller learning communities: the School of the Academy of Finance and Law (formerly known as "The Academy of Finance and Law"); the School of Business and Commerce; the School of Human Services; the School of Communications and Technology; the School of Humanities and Fine and Cultural Arts; and the Ninth Grade Achievement School. The goal and mission of Lake Clifton Eastern High School was "to provide an educational program relevant to the needs of all students to prepare them for college/post secondary education, or the world of work."

On January 30, 1995, an electrical fire caused by faulty wiring destroyed the school's original two-story library, cafeteria, and administrative offices. In 1998, a one-story state-of-the-art media center and library was built to replace the fire-damaged section, at the cost of $4 million, which would be $5,344,512.24 adjusted for inflation in 2010.

=== 1984–2020: Decline and closure ===
Discipline problems, high dropout rates, violence, low test scores and low attendance had plagued the school for decades. Shooting incidents occurred on the campus on January 5, 1984, a fatal shooting on October 8, 1985, a fatal shooting on January 29, 1986, and a fatal shooting resulting in the death of a high school student occurred on January 17, 2001.

Following an ill-timed attempt to close the school during the middle of the 2001–2002 academic year, the city school board decided in March 2003 that LCEHS would be downsized into a smaller school after the graduation of the Class of 2005, as the buildings suffered deteriorating conditions, such as a hole in the piping in the steam-heating system, triggering an explosion that destroyed ceiling tiles in one of the school's wings, as well as gradual, annual sinking into the former, filled-in reservoir. Declining enrollment was also a problem; Lake Clifton-Eastern was designed to hold about 4,000 students, but by the time the city school board recommended downsizing the school, the buildings only housed 2,300 students. With support from the Small Schools Workshop, school faculty members and administrators met and planned new, small, learning communities to open within Lake Clifton. However, the board changed plans and decided on new uses for the campus, dividing the school population to other schools. As a result, Lake Clifton-Eastern High School permanently closed its doors after the 2004–2005 school year, and the building was converted into the Lake Clifton Campus consisting into two separate, smaller schools: Heritage High School and Doris M. Johnson High School. A third school, City Springs Elementary/Middle Alternative Charter School was temporarily on the campus before moving to the Belair-Edison neighborhood.

The REACH! Partnership School moved onto the rebranded Lake Clifton Campus (LCC) in 2007, and expanded after the closure of Doris M. Johnson High School in 2011. Baltimore City Public Schools (BCPS) slated Heritage High for permanent closure after the 2014–2015 school year as a cost-cutting and consolidation measure, alongside continued declining enrollment. Faced with continuing population decline and shrinking school enrollment altogether, the City of Baltimore permanently closed the campus in August 2020, and announded plans to sell the property for potential redevelopment.

=== 2022–present: Redevelopment ===
Morgan State University acquired the property on April 6, 2022, announcing five days prior that a satellite campus would be built on the 59-acre (24 ha) site. Morgan State announced on October 17, 2025, that the abandoned buildings, which suffered from vandalism, would begin demolition in January 2026.

Demolition was completed in August 2026.

== Notable alumni ==
- Will Barton – NBA player
- Chester Frazier - basketball coach
- Thomas Jordan – NBA player
- Shawnta Rogers – professional basketball player
- Josh Selby – NBA player
- Michael Antonio "Mike" King – Professional European Basketball Player

== See also ==
- Clifton Park Valve House
- Northern Campus
