= Patterson Park =

Park in Baltimore, Maryland, US

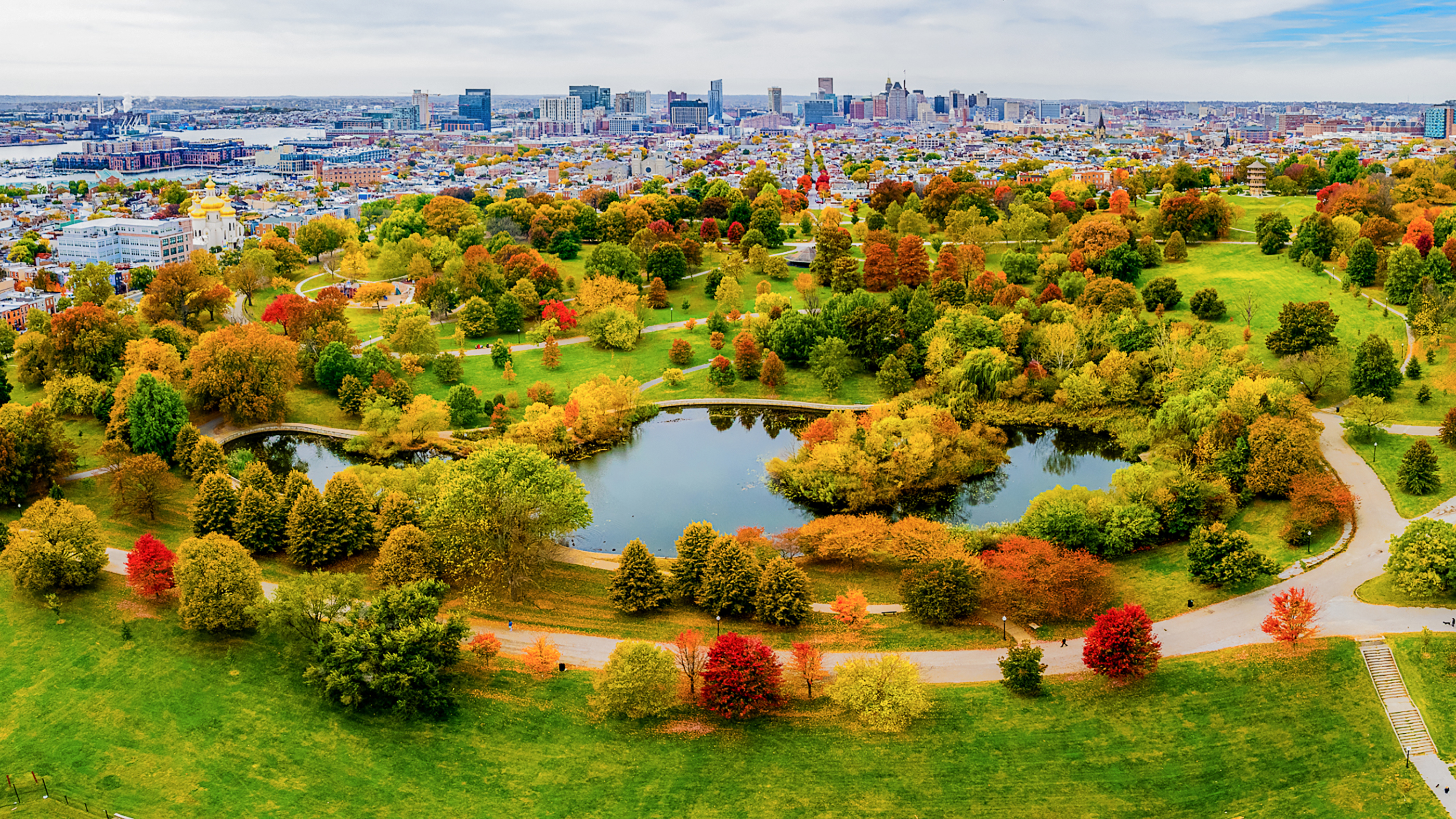
- Patterson Park in October
- Interactive map of Patterson Park
- Type: Public park
- Location: Baltimore, Maryland
- Coordinates: 39°17′16″N 76°34′43″W
- Created: 1827

Patterson Park is an urban park in Southeast Baltimore, Maryland, United States, adjacent to the neighborhoods of Canton, Highlandtown, Patterson Park, and Butchers Hill. It is bordered by East Baltimore Street, Eastern Avenue, South Patterson Park Avenue, and South Linwood Avenue. The Patterson Park extension lies to the east of the main park, and is bordered by East Pratt Street, South Ellwood Avenue, and Eastern Avenue.

Patterson Park was established in 1827 and named for William Patterson (1752–1835). The park consists of open fields of grass, large trees, paved walkways, historic battle sites, a lake, playgrounds, athletic fields, a swimming pool, an ice skating rink and other signature attractions and buildings. At 137 acres (0.55 km^{2}), Patterson Park is not the city's largest park; however, it is nicknamed "Best Backyard in Baltimore."

== Attractions and activities ==
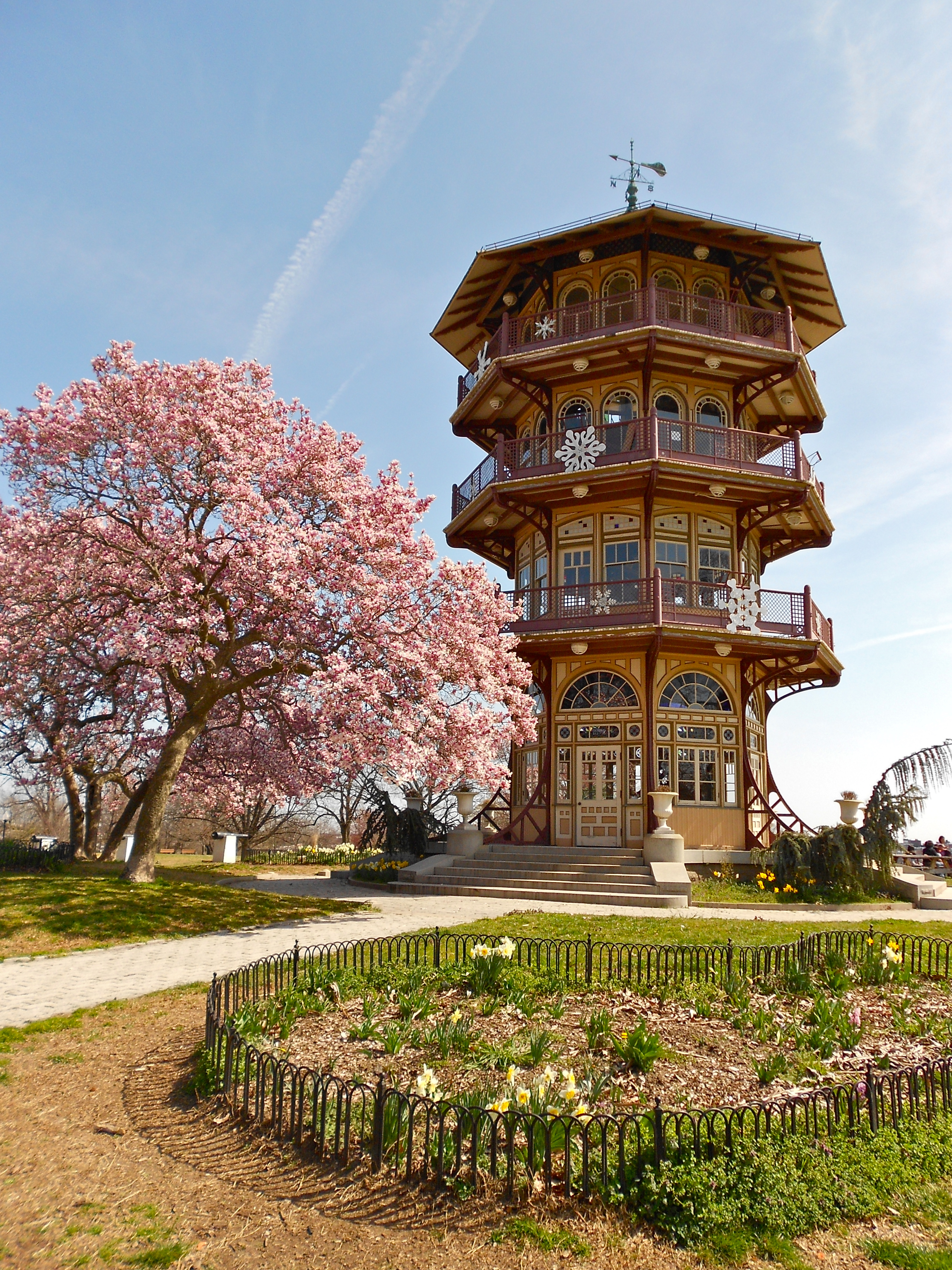
The "Observatory" a pagoda-style building on Hampstead Hill, overlooking the rest of the park.

Patterson Park has four main entrances at each corner. Its notable attractions include the boat lake (where fishing is permitted), the marble fountain, the Pulaski Monument, and the Patterson Park Observatory. The Patterson Park Observatory was built in 1891 as an observation tower for viewing the city and is still open to visitors. The park is also home to the Virginia S. Baker Recreation Center.

The park has smooth pathways suitable for biking and jogging. The sports fields are open for use to anyone who wants to play a game, and there are public tennis courts as well. There are two playgrounds for children as well as a fenced-in dog park. There is a swimming pool open during the summer and an ice skating rink that operates during winter. From spring to early autumn, several festivals are held in the park. The neighborhood surrounding the park is part of an innovative urban renewal campaign by the city and neighborhood leaders.

Baltimore City F.C is an American Premier Soccer League club that plays since 2023 at Utz Field in Patterson Park.

== History ==
The high ground at the northwest corner of Patterson Park, called Hampstead Hill, was the key defensive position for U.S. forces against British ground forces in the Battle of Baltimore during the War of 1812. The redoubt was known as Rodgers Bastion, or Sheppard's Bastion, and was the centerpiece of the earthen line dug to defend the eastern approach to Baltimore, from the outer harbor in Canton north to Belair Road. On September 13, 1814, the day after the Battle of North Point, some 4,300 British troops advanced north on North Point Road, then west along the Philadelphia Road toward Baltimore, forcing U.S. troops to retreat to the defensive line. When the British began probing actions, the American line was defended by 100 cannon and more than 10,000 troops. The American defenses were far stronger than anticipated, and U.S. defenders at Fort McHenry successfully stopped British naval forces from advancing close enough to lend artillery support, and British attempts to flank the defense were countered. Thus, before dawn on September 14, 1814, British commander Colonel Arthur Brooke decided the land campaign was a lost cause, and ordered the retreat back to the ships, and the United States was thus victorious in the Battle of Baltimore.

William Patterson (d. 1835), a Baltimore merchant, donated 5 acres (20,000 m^{2}) to the city for a public walk in 1827, and the city purchased an additional 29 acres (120,000 m^{2}) from the Patterson family in 1860. Additions and improvements to the park made after 1859 were funded through the city's "park tax" on its streetcars, which was initially set at 20% of the fare. During the Civil War, the site was used as a Union troop encampment. Additional purchases in later years increased the park size to its present 137 acres (0.55 km^{2}).

Several public accommodations at the park such as the swimming pools, picnic pavilions, and playgrounds were managed as "separate but equal" until they were desegregated in 1956. The park is included in the Baltimore National Heritage Area.

On October 10, 1962, President John F. Kennedy visited Baltimore and landed in his helicopter at the park and took an open top car to the 5th Regiment Armory. He was in town prior to the midterm elections to stump for the Democratic ticket.

During the George Floyd protests of 2020, the Pulaski monument was vandalized, being spray-painted red with the words "White Lies" spray-painted on the base.

=== Patterson Park Observatory ===
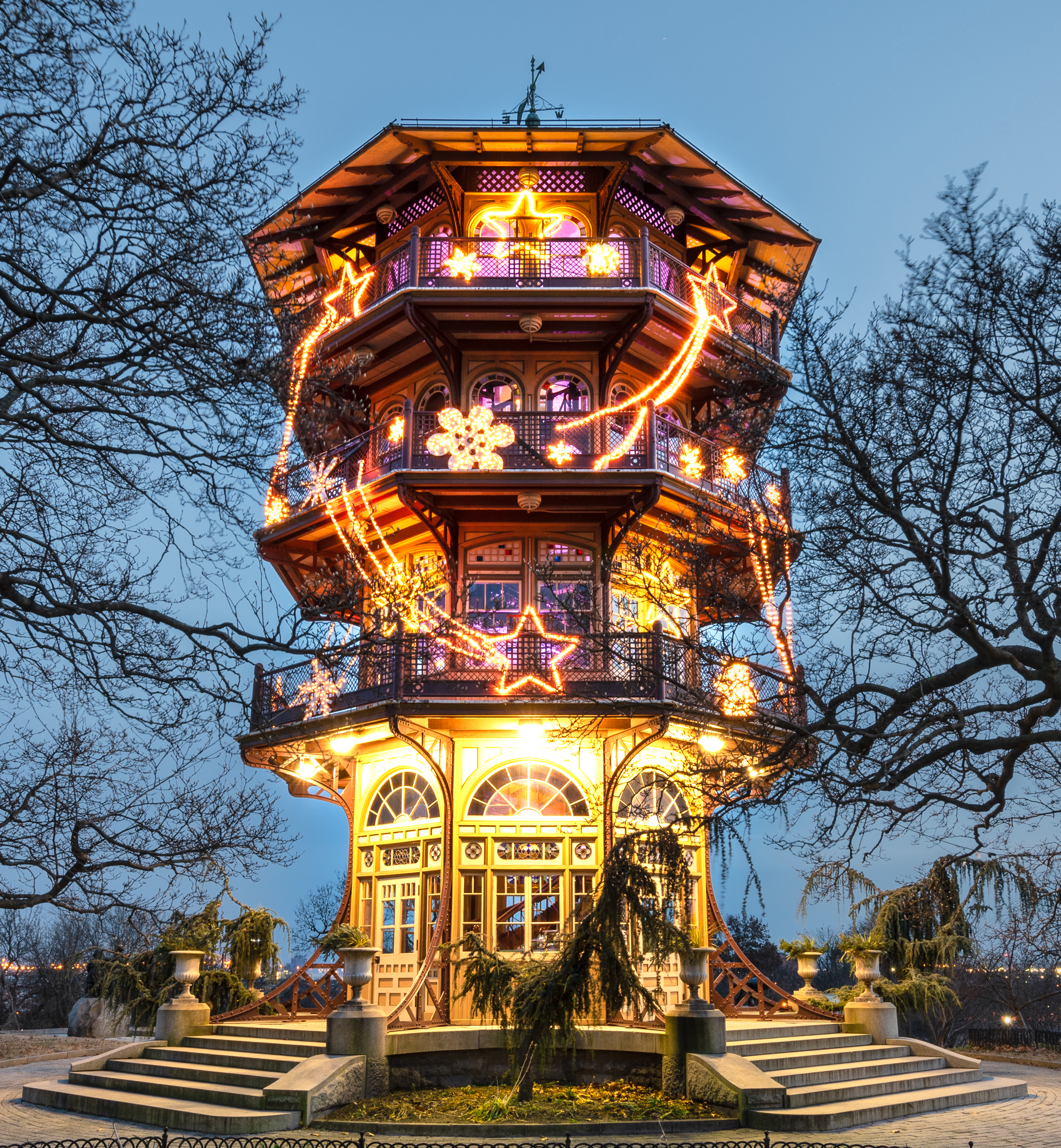
Patterson Park Observatory lit up during Christmas

The 60-foot (18 m) Observatory, previously known as the Pagoda, was designed in 1890 and completed in 1892 by Charles H. Latrobe, who was the general superintendent and engineer under the Park Commission, led along with architect George A. Frederick, who also designed Baltimore City Hall. It was designed as a people's lookout tower with an Asian motif, inspired by Latrobe's fascination with the East. The Observatory was designated as a Baltimore City Landmark in 1982.
