= Andres Alonso =

American educator

Andrés A. Alonso

CEO, Baltimore City Public Schools
- In office July 1, 2007 – June 30, 2013
- Preceded by: Charlene Cooper Boston

Deputy Chancellor, New York City Department of Education
- In office July 1, 2006 – July 1, 2007

Personal details
- Born: June 14, 1957 (age 69) Cuba
- Education: Columbia University; Harvard Law School; Harvard Graduate School of Education

Andrés Alonso (born June 14, 1957) was the chief executive officer of the Baltimore City Public School System in Baltimore, Maryland, United States. Alonso came to Baltimore from the New York City Public School system in July 2007. He had been deputy chancellor in New York for the year prior to his appointment in Baltimore.

== Education ==
Alonso graduated from Columbia University, magna cum laude and Phi Beta Kappa, obtained a J.D. from Harvard Law School and then an Ed.M. in 1999 and Ed.D. in 2006 from the Harvard Graduate School of Education.

== Career ==
Prior to his arrival in 2007, the Baltimore City Public Schools system was in a state of decay and decline with several of its schools performing so poorly that the state of Maryland was poised to intervene and take over much of the system. Fewer than half of students entering Baltimore's high schools graduated and proficiency levels in reading and math were far below both the state and national averages. By 2010 both state elected and local elected officials were touting the job done by Alonso in turning the failing school system around. Under Alonso's leadership millions of education dollars were diverted from the systems administrative offices to the schools themselves, failing schools were closed and principals were given more fiscal autonomy. A December 2010 article in The New York Times characterizes the school system as having improved under the leadership of Dr. Alonso.

It was announced on May 6, 2013, that Alonso would be resigning his position as CEO of Baltimore City Public Schools on June 30, 2013. Tisha Edwards, previously Chief of Staff to Alonso, assumed the position of Interim CEO on July 1, 2013.

Alsonso is currently a director of Scholastic Corporation, and the Carnegie Foundation for the Advancement of Teaching.
