= Baltimore City Public Schools =

School district in Baltimore, Maryland

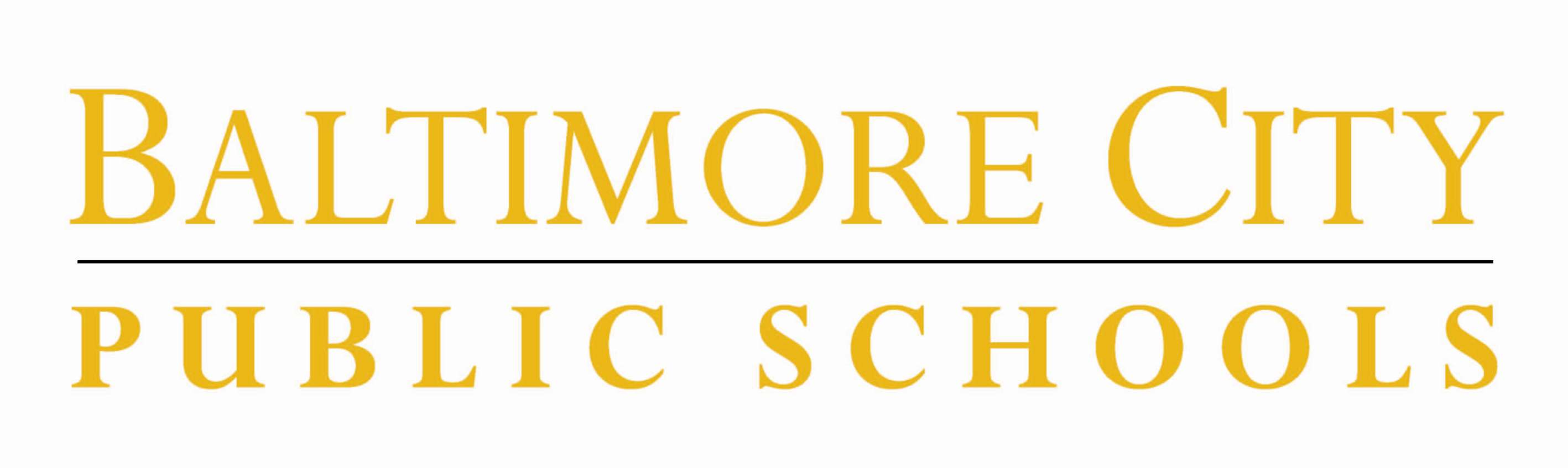

Location
- 200 East North Avenue, at North Calvert Street; "Dr. Alice G. Pinderhughes School Administration Headquarters"; Baltimore, Maryland 21218, re-built/renovated/enlarged 1980's, former building of the Baltimore Polytechnic Institute, (1912–1967), also former site of the Maryland School for the Blind (1868–1912)
- Coordinates: 39°18′43″N 76°36′46″W

District information
- Type: Public
- Grades: Pre-kindergarten–12th grade (high school)
- Established: 1829 by Baltimore City Council (authorized by General Assembly of Maryland, in an Act of 1827)
- Superintendent: Jermaine Dawson
- Schools: 150
- Budget: $1.7 billion (2021)
- NCES District ID: 2400090

Students and staff
- Students: 76,807 (2024–25)
- Teachers: 5,328.60 (on an FTE basis)
- Staff: 8,593 (2021–22)
- Student–teacher ratio: 14.41
- Colors: Black and gold (city/state/Calvert family colors)

Other information
- School board: Baltimore City Board of School Commissioners (previously (1829) as Board of Commissioners, Public Schools of Baltimore City)
- Teacher union: Baltimore Teachers Union (chapter of the American Federation of Teachers [AFT]; (previously the Public School Teachers Association of Baltimore City [PTSA], founded 1849, chapter of the National Education Association [NEA])
- Website: www.baltimorecityschools.org, also information on www.baltimorecity.gov

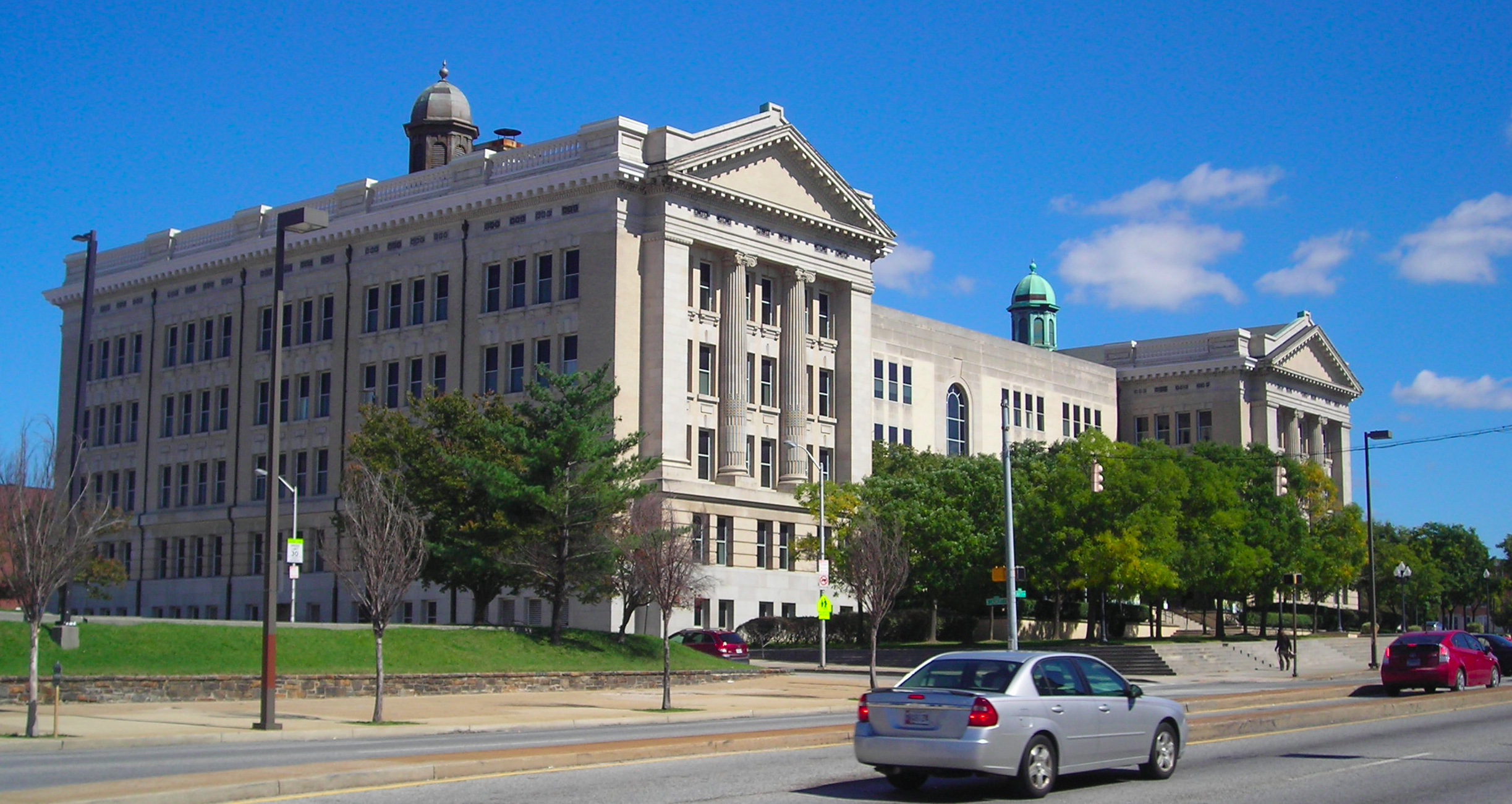
Dr. Alice G. Pinderhughes Administrative Headquarters, Baltimore City Public Schools, 200 East North Avenue at North Calvert Street - formerly the Baltimore Polytechnic Institute (high school), 1912–1967, previously original site of the Maryland School for the Blind, 1868–1912, renovated/rebuilt 1980s

Baltimore City Public Schools, also referred to as City Schools, is a public school district in the city of Baltimore, state of Maryland, United States. It serves the youth of Baltimore City (in distinction to the separate and "younger" public school system (district) for the surrounding separate county of Baltimore, known as the Baltimore County Public Schools [BCoPS]). Traditionally, however, the Baltimore City Public Schools system has not referred to itself as a "district," as the operation of the schools was synonymous with the city of Baltimore. Its headquarters are located on 200 East North Avenue at North Calvert Street in the Dr. Alice G. Pinderhughes Administration Building.

The local school district that is situated within a county-equivalent level area of an independent city. In 2012, it is currently the fourth largest school system in Maryland. In the 2014–15 school year, the student enrollment is approximately 84,000 students. It also maintains 1 pre-k/kindergarten school, 54 elementary schools, 75 K-8 schools, 7 middle schools, 15 secondary schools, 28 high schools, 1 K-12 school, and 7 alternative programs.

== History ==
City Schools was part of the Baltimore City Government since 1829, but became separate from the government in 1997 when partial control by the Superintendent of Public Instruction and the Board of School Commissioners was ceded to the State of Maryland in exchange for increased funding and an expanded partnership. Now, the Mayor solely appoints the revamped Board of School Commissioners (School Board) that oversees the BCPS system, and which in turn interviews and hires the C.E.O. (Chief Executive Officer) and C.A.O. (Chief Academic Officer). The school system is currently run by CEO Sonja Santelises.

=== African-American schools ===
The "Baltimore Association for the Moral and Intellectual Improvement of the Colored People" was an organization that aimed to improve the education of African Americans in Baltimore. It was founded on November 28, 1864 by a group of white men. Operation of its schools was taken over by the city in 1867.

=== Desegregation ===
City Schools were desegregated in 1954 following the ruling of the Supreme Court of the United States in Brown v. Board of Education. Limited desegregation had already happened with the Baltimore Polytechnic Institute being forced to admit African-American students on its prestigious "A" course in 1952, as none of the black schools in Baltimore offered an equal or equivalent course.

=== High schools ===
High schools that have been well known include Baltimore School for the Arts, a public high school that is nationally recognized for its success in preparing students for the arts; Carver Vocational-Technical High School, the first African-American vocational high school and center established in the state of Maryland; Digital Harbor High School, one of the only secondary schools that emphasizes in information technology; Frederick Douglass High School, the second oldest African-American High School in the United States; Lake Clifton Eastern High School; the largest school campus of physical size in Baltimore City; Baltimore City College, the third oldest public high school in the country; Western High School, the oldest public all-girls high school in the nation; and Baltimore Polytechnic Institute, a public high school ranked 36th in STEM in the country in 2019 by Newsweek that shares the second-oldest high school football rivalry with Baltimore City College.

== Criticism and recent developments ==
In late 2003, City Schools was discovered to be in a severe fiscal crisis, with a deficit estimated to be anywhere from $54–64 million (depending on the reporting source). As a means of reducing the gap, extensive layoffs of teachers and staff took place and new controls were enacted to ensure that spending was more closely monitored. A loan from the city temporarily ended the deficit and City Schools paid the loan back over a two-year period. Criticism of the system still takes place with regard to the awarding of "emergency" contracts.

In 2011, Baltimore City Public Schools had the second-highest per student cost among the nation's 100 largest school districts according to the U.S. Census Bureau, spending $15,483 per student per year.

In the 2010–11 school year there were approximately 83,634 in the entire school system (non-charter and charter). The projected operating budget for the 2011 school year is $1.23 billion. This suggests that the per student spending including charter schools is $14,707.

From March 1, 2006 to March 4, 2006, City Schools students from high schools across Baltimore City held a three-day student strike to oppose an imminent plan to "consolidate" many area high schools into fewer buildings. The school system asserted that these buildings are underutilized. The students and other advocates assert that the reason the extra space exists in these buildings is because class sizes often are about 40 students per class. Martin J. O'Malley, then-mayor of Baltimore, apparently gave an ear to the students' demands in this latest round of strike actions, fearing it could affect his status with the general public in a gubernatorial election year. The end of March saw a change in the balance of power, with the State of Maryland threatening to take over 11 City schools.

On April 8, 2007 The Baltimore Sun's Sara Neufeld stated in an article that the Baltimore City Public School budget was full of errors.

A recent poll conducted by The Baltimore Sun and Annapolis pollster OpinionWorks July 8–10, 2007 recently revealed Baltimore citizens grim opinion of the system. Asked to grade the Baltimore public schools, 2 percent of respondents gave the system an A; 10 percent gave it a B; 32 percent chose C; 22 percent D; and 20 percent Fail, with 15 percent unsure. If the system were assigned a mean grade-point average based on the poll, it would be a 1.45, the equivalent of about a D-plus".

A December 2010 article in The New York Times characterizes the school system as having improved under the leadership of Dr. Alonso.

A March 2012 article in The Baltimore Sun illustrates how the budget is not being carefully monitored. The severe budget cuts led to a thin staff working overtime, leading to high overtime wage earnings. Along with this, Dr. Andres Alonso's driver earned double his salary in overtime, making his pay in the previous year higher than Governor Martin O'Malley's.

On November 27, 2012, Dr. Andres Alonso announced a 10-Year Plan which, pending approval of the school board, will lead to the closing of four elementary/middle schools following the 2012–2013 school year, as well as the closing of thirteen additional schools over the next five years. The plan also includes proposals for renovating and relocating the schools not being affected by closures.
