= Cordish =

Cordish may refer to:

== Surname ==
- David S. Cordish (1940–), American real estate developer
- Paul L. Cordish (1909–2003), American politician
- Reed Cordish (1974–), American political adviser

== Other ==
- The Cordish Companies, American real estate development company
