= Rainbow Centre Factory Outlet =

Abandoned mall in Niagara County, New York, U.S.

- Location: Niagara Falls, New York, United States
- Coordinates: 43.0870°N 79.0625°W
- Address: 302 Rainbow Blvd N, 14303
- Opened: July 2, 1982; 44 years ago
- Closed: September 30, 2000; 26 years ago
- Demolished: October 2010 – September 2012 (partial, mall interior only)
- Previous names: Rainbow Centre Mall (1982–1990)
- Developer: The Cordish Companies
- Manager: Empire State Development Corp.; SUNY Niagara
- Owner: Empire State Development Corp.; SUNY Niagara
- Architect: Victor Gruen Associates; César Pelli and Associates
- Num. of stores: 60+ (at peak)
- Num. of anchor tenants: 1 (vacant since 1999)
- Floor area: 287,000 square feet (27,000 m^{2})
- Floors: 2
- Parking: Parking garage

Rainbow Centre Factory Outlet, formerly the Rainbow Centre Mall (informally referred to simply as Rainbow Mall) is an abandoned mall in Niagara Falls, New York, adjacent to the now-demolished Wintergarden indoor botanical garden on its southern end.

Originally developed by Cordish Company as a sister to Baltimore's Harborplace, the mall was largely unprofitable throughout its years. Its only anchor, Beir's Department Store, became Burlington Coat Factory after David S. Cordish decided to convert the shopping center into an outlet mall to better compete with Fashion Outlets of Niagara Falls.

After failing to attract residents from Buffalo, New York and Niagara Falls, Ontario, the mall permanently closed its doors at the end of September 2000. While Cordish would convert it into an entertainment district and hoped that the closure would be temporary, this never came into fruition, and the former mall was ultimately sold to Niagara County Community College (now SUNY Niagara) in October 2010, with Barnes & Noble and Niagara Falls Culinary Institute opening in a portion of the defunct space in September 2012.

As of June 2021, Empire State Development Corporation (ESD) and Marvel Architects are in the process of redeveloping Rainbow Centre Factory Outlet into a mixed-use complex.

== History ==
=== 1967–1982: Development and opening ===
In November 1967, the Niagara Falls Urban Renewal Agency (NFURA) established the Rainbow Center Project No. 1 Urban Renewal Plan designed to completely revitalize and rebuild downtown Niagara Falls, New York, which suffered from severe economic decline from post-World War II suburbanization, and the June 7, 1956 destruction of the Schoellkopf Power Station from a massive rockslide. The Canadian side of Niagara Falls (Niagara Falls, Ontario), in contrast, was rapidly modernizing, with family-friendly attractions, high-rise hotels, and view-focused infrastructure.

The master plan covered a critical grid of downtown Niagara Falls, bounded by Niagara Street to the north, Third Street to the east, Rainbow Boulevard to the south, and Prospect Street to the west. It also focused on closing unnecessary alleys, widening major streets, introducing major parking facilities, and installing a landscaped pedestrian mall. This resulted in the mass demolition of several derelict industrial warehouses. While most of the sprawling concept was never fully developed, the master plan allowed for the later January 12, 1974 opening of the Niagara Falls Convention and Civic Center, followed by the Niagara Falls Wintergarden, a Botanical garden, in 1977.

In 1979, the Baltimore, Maryland-based Cordish Company, led by David S. Cordish, was selected under a 75-year leasehold agreement, and developed a parking ramp structure (completed in 1981) adjacent to the Wintergarden, which would be the final component to the master plan. The first two floors of the parking ramp would be converted into an enclosed shopping mall relying on the festival marketplace concept known as Rainbow Centre Mall, inspired by The Rouse Company's highly successful Harborplace in Baltimore's Inner Harbor. Rainbow Centre had its formal grand opening on July 2, 1982, approximately two years after Harborplace's grand opening (July 2, 1980). The mall featured the historic Beir's Department Store, which was originally established in the city by Edwin Beir as Beir Bros. around 1891. Rainbow Centre Mall featured over 60 traditional storefronts, including national brands The Gap, Casual Corner, RadioShack, and GNC, and a food court branded as Bon Appetit, with vendors Häagen-Dazs, Chez Chocolat, Palis Hamburg, and It's Greek To Me.

=== 1982–2000: Decline and closure ===
The mall hosted several community events, as well as attracting millions of families when its celebrations tied with annual holidays, most particularly the Winter Festival of Lights, where the interior of Rainbow Centre would feature seasonal decorations. However, a major blow came in 1986 when Beir's permanently closed.

The mall struggled due to its poor integration into a parking garage, leading to retail stores and eateries being tucked away from the public. As a result, Rainbow Centre was not making a profit, and to fix this, The Cordish Company converted the mall into an outlet center known as Rainbow Centre Factory Outlet in February 1990, with the former Beir's space becoming Burlington Coat Factory, and the addition of the Western Regional Off-Track Betting (OTB) lounge. Despite this, heavy competition from Niagara Factory Outlet Mall (now Fashion Outlets of Niagara Falls) continued exacerbating, when Prime Retail, Inc. acquired it in December 1997 for $89 million. Prior to that, the mall added Saks Off 5th, further leading Niagara Factory Outlet Mall to become the more popular option.

Burlington closed permanently in 1999, and since Cordish was unable to adapt to make the mall more competitive with Fashion Outlets of Niagara Falls, they announced that the mall would officially close its doors on September 30, 2000, with all tenants being asked to vacate excluding OTB. As part of Cordish's shift to entertainment districts, starting with Power Plant Live! in Baltimore, they hoped to renovate Rainbow Centre Mall to make it part of its entertainment district portfolio, with a notice posted on the mall's entrance stating "MALL CLOSED FOR RENOVATIONS – ENTRY RESTRICTED TO CUSTOMERS OF OTB & INTERNATIONAL FOOD." However, this never materialized, and OTB closed permanently in October 2005, leaving the mall completely abandoned.

=== 2010–present: Redevelopment ===
In October 2010, David Cordish personally sold the abandoned mall to Niagara County Community College for use as a culinary institute, student-run restaurant, and a Barnes & Noble Booksellers bookstore. The Institute and bookstore opened in September 2012, known as Niagara Falls Culinary Institute, with 90,000 sq ft (8,400 m^{2}) and cost $26 million. In August 2014, the state partnered with the Buffalo-based Uniland Development Company to propose Water Falls Resort, a $150 million indoor water park and hotel project, announced by then-Governor Andrew Cuomo. However, the project was canceled in December 2019 due to "economic feasibility."

The rest of the mall had its interior gutted and remained abandoned, and therefore fell into severe disrepair and vandalism, appearing more as the parking garage above it rather than a shopping mall. Empire State Development Corporation (ESD), through a subsidiary called USA Niagara Development Corporation (USAN), sent a Request for Proposals seeking an architectural firm to help design the redevelopment for the remaining 200,000 sq ft (19,000 m^{2}) of the mall into a mixed-use complex, adding new retail and restaurants. Marvel Architects was selected, and announced in June 2021, the proposal would move forward. The project would also boost tourism and improve downtown walkability.

== See also ==
- Circle East, another dead mall developed by Cordish as Towson Circle / Towson Square in Baltimore County, Maryland
- The Shops at National Place, which also sat abandoned due to a flawed architectural layout
- The Gallery at Harborplace
- 6th Street Marketplace, which also sat abandoned since the 2000s
- Westfield World Trade Center
- Fourth Street Live!, a modern shopping mall also developed by Cordish
- Waterside District, which was redeveloped by Cordish to replace Waterside Festival Marketplace, also developed by Rouse
