= Pratt Street Power Plant =

Historic former power plant in Baltimore, Maryland, U.S.

- U.S. National Register of Historic Places
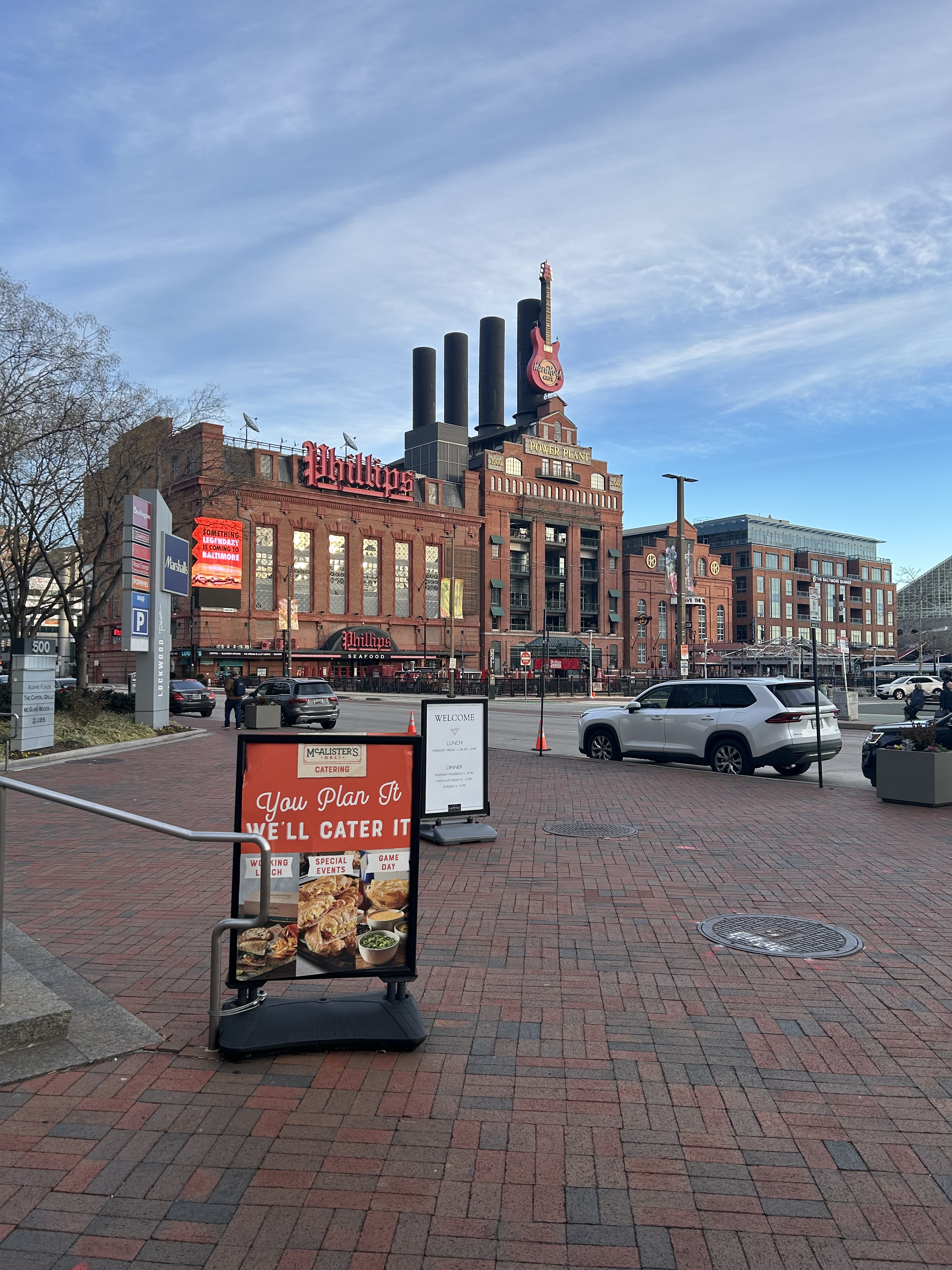
- The Pratt Street Power Plant in January 2026 at sunset, view from the south, also contains the defunct Barnes & Noble space.

- Location within Baltimore Location within Maryland Location within the United States
- Location: 601 E. Pratt St., Baltimore, Maryland
- Coordinates: 39°17′9.7″N 76°36′25.6″W
- Area: 1.4 acres (0.57 ha)
- Built: 1900
- Architect: Baldwin & Pennington; Et al.
- NRHP reference No.: 87000564
- Added to NRHP: April 9, 1987

The Pratt Street Power Plant—also known as the Pier IV Power Plant, The Power Plant, and Pratt Street Station—is a historic former power plant located in Downtown Baltimore, Maryland, United States. Since its decommissioning in 1973, it has been redeveloped several times for other uses, including the short-lived Six Flags Power Plant theme park. The building has been listed on the National Register of Historic Places since 1987.

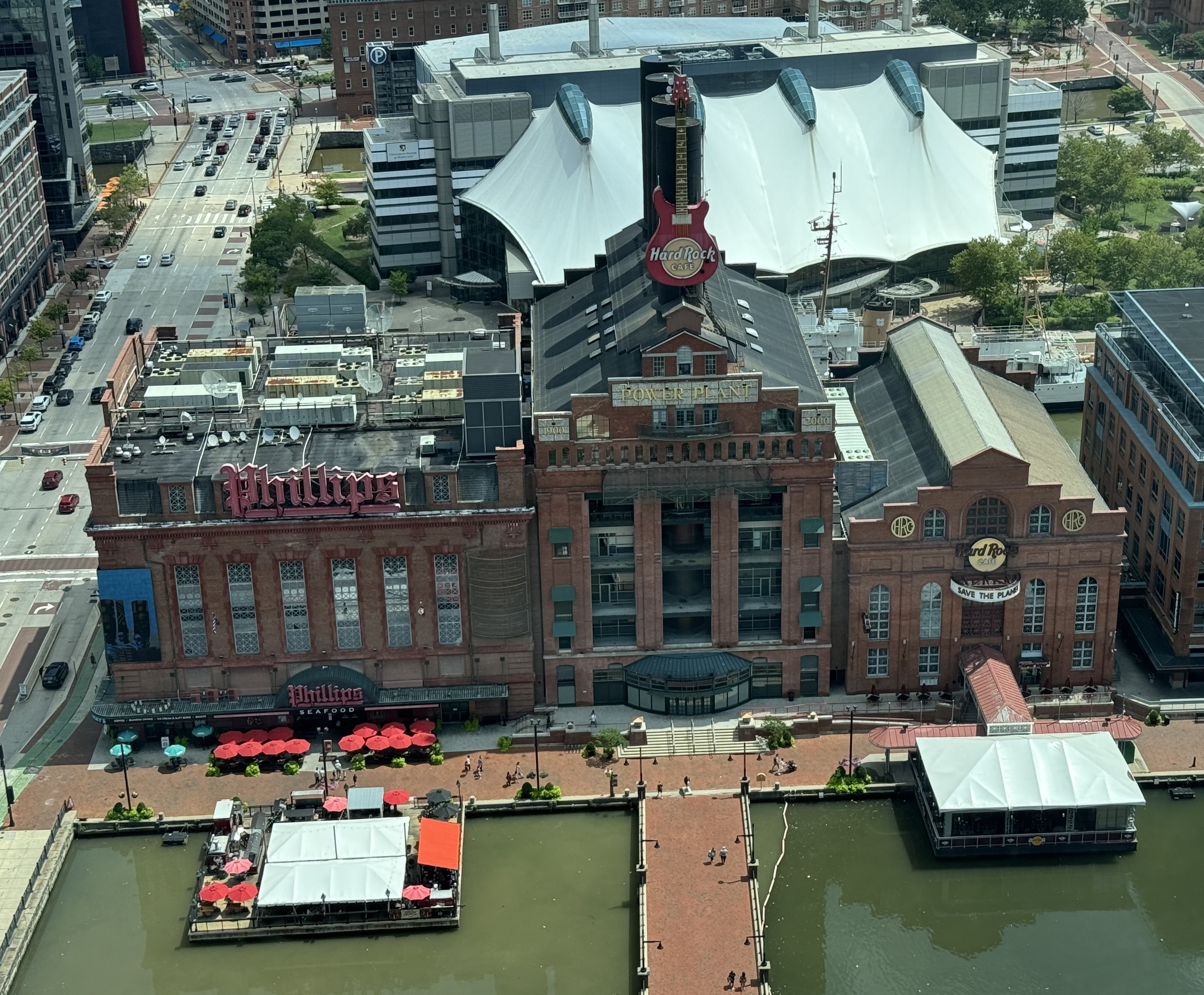
View of the Power Plant from the Baltimore World Trade Center in August 2024

== History ==
=== The building and its active years ===
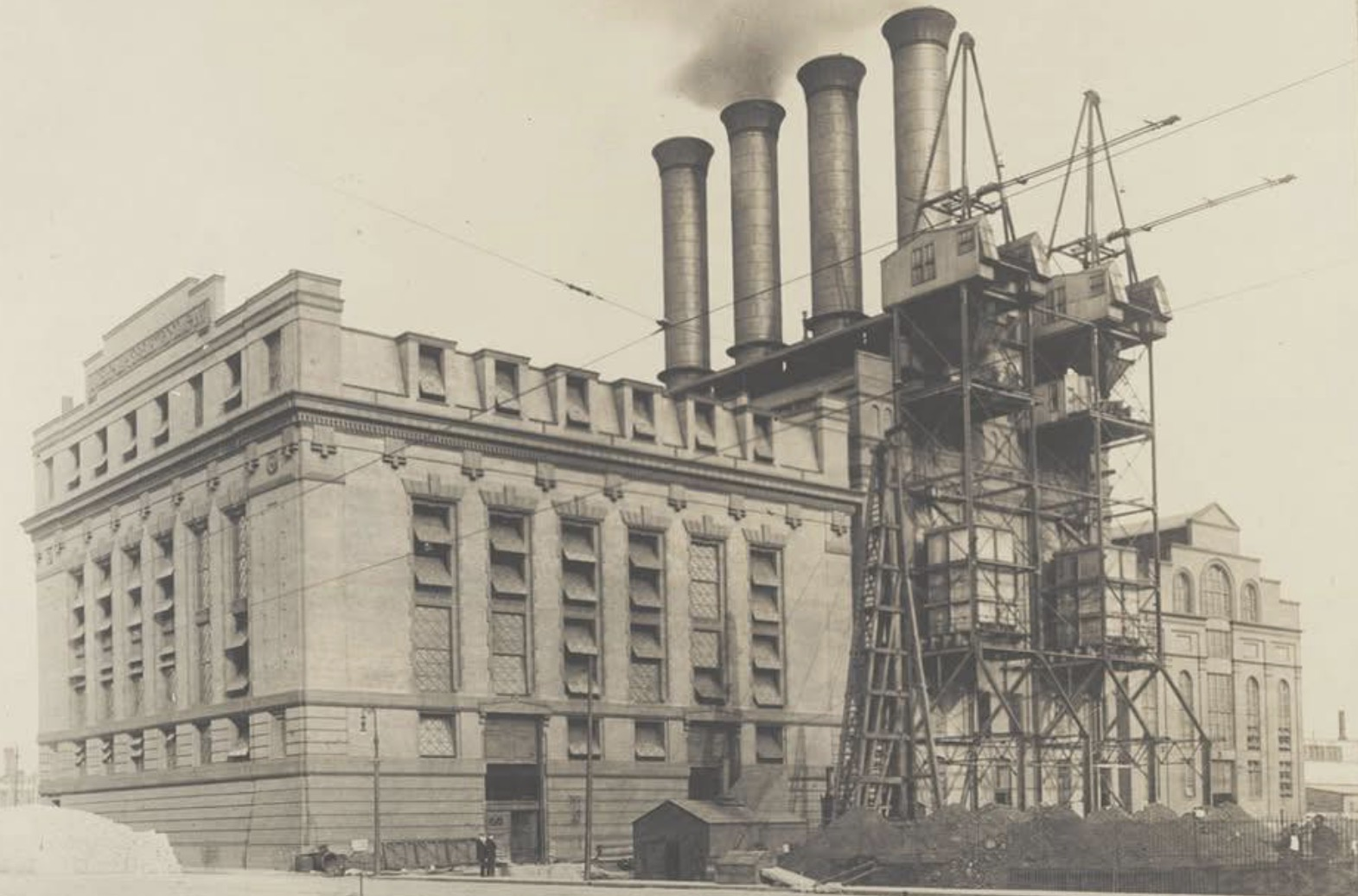
Exterior view, c. 1910s

The structure is a 132-by-326-foot (40 by 99 m) complex of three buildings located at Pratt Street and Pier 4 at Baltimore's Inner Harbor. The structures are brick with terra cotta trim and steel frame construction. It was built between 1900 and 1909 and is a massive industrial structure with Neo-Classical detailing designed by the architectural firm of Baldwin & Pennington. It was one of only 11 buildings in the zone of the Baltimore Fire of 1904 to survive that event.

It served as the main source of power for the United Railways and Electric Company, a consolidation of smaller street railway systems, that influenced the provision of citywide transportation and opened up suburban areas of Baltimore to power its electric street railway in the city. It later served as a central steam plant for the Consolidated Gas, Electric Light and Power Company, a predecessor of the Baltimore Gas and Electric Company.

The boilers were coal-fired, and the plant's location on the harbor allowed easy delivery of coal by ship. The location also provided access to cooling water for the condensers, with intake on one side of the pier and discharge on the other. The plant, with by-then obsolete equipment, was used sparingly until it was returned to service to meet the World War II production demand for electricity. Baltimore Gas & Electric finally ceased use of it in 1973.

=== Early redevelopment efforts ===
After the electric plant was retired from service, the building was vacant for several years. It was acquired by the City of Baltimore in 1977. The first phase of the city's redevelopment of the property converted a warehouse on the pier into a Chart House seafood restaurant. The power plant's coal hoist was removed in 1979.

In January 1979, Charles Center-Inner Harbor Management, Inc., requested that developers submit proposals that would reuse the power plant building without modifying its exterior. Out of 11 proposals, the city selected the Omni Power House Hotel, which was to be designed by architect Moshe Safdie. The hotel plan was canceled in November 1980, because the developers could not afford the cost of strengthening the pier to support the increased weight of the redeveloped building.

A second round of redevelopment proposals was solicited in 1982. The six proposals received included a theme park co-owned by Hershey Entertainment and Resorts Company, a climate-controlled urban vineyard, and a combination boat dealership and maritime museum whose principal investors included Walter Cronkite. The winning proposal, Six Flags Over Baltimore, was an indoor Six Flags amusement park which would be themed around time travel to turn-of-the-century America, with science-fiction author Ray Bradbury and Hollywood production designer John DeCuir contributing to the project concept.

=== Six Flags/P.T. Flagg's Power Plant ===
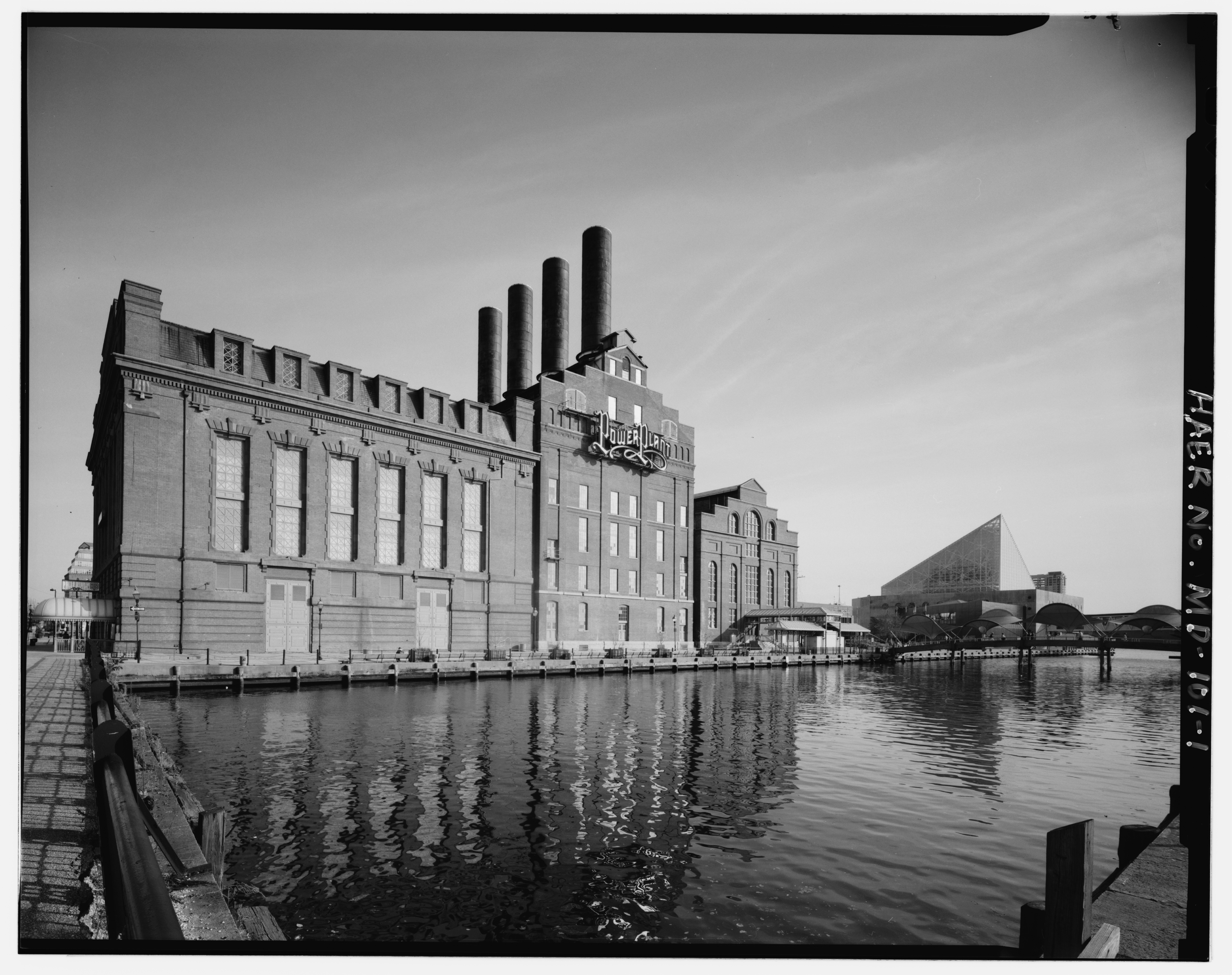
Exterior view, c. 1980s

The Power Plant was a departure from Six Flags' other properties, all large outdoor amusement parks with a wide variety of thrill rides. It was one of the company's first Urban Entertainment Center projects, alongside AutoWorld in Flint, Michigan, and the SS Admiral in St. Louis, and Six Flags executives hoped that more of these urban developments would be built in the future. The city finalized its lease agreement with Six Flags in December 1983, by which time Bradbury and DeCuir had left the project.

Jon Jerde and his company, Jerde Partnership, were hired as the architects for the building redevelopment. Landmark Entertainment Group, headed by Gary Goddard and Tony Christopher, was tasked with designing the entertainment attractions. The designers and concept artists working on the park included many notable Disney Imagineers and animators who were between projects at the time, including Herbert Ryman, Marc Davis, Al Bertino, and Eddie Sotto.

Landmark proposed various thrill rides for the park, but Six Flags officials told them that no rides could be included. Jerde had intended to develop the building as a shopping mall with limited theming, while Landmark intended to convert the entire building into the theme park. Jerde ultimately resigned from the project, allowing Landmark to take over more aspects of design. Gale Kober Associates replaced Jerde as the lead architectural firm.

The park was themed to be the laboratory and curio collection of a fictional Victorian era inventor, Professor Phineas Templeton Flagg, inspired by the works of Jules Verne and H.G. Wells and named with reference to P.T. Barnum. Four attractions were included: two walk-through displays, The Laboratory of Wonders and The Circus of the Mysterious; an animatronic theater, The Magic Lantern Theatre; and the world's first 4D film theater, The Sensorium. Other features included specialty shops, musical automatons, and arcade games.

Six Flags Power Plant opened on July 8, 1985. Attendance quickly fell below expectations, leading to changes. In September, the park's hours were cut back on weekdays, and the Looney Tunes mascot characters that could be found at other Six Flags parks were added. Beginning November 29, 1985, admission to the park was reduced from $7.95 to $2.25 to attract more visitors, although with an additional surcharge to enter some attractions.

Starting June 26, 1986, the park offered separate admission to The Magic Lantern Theatre, which after 6 p.m. ET became a nightclub called P.T. Flagg's. Six Flags announced on January 6, 1987, that the theme park would be permanently closed immediately, while the P.T. Flagg's nightclub would be expanded into the rest of the building. Company executives admitted that the park had never been profitable. Designer Gary Goddard later blamed the failure of the project on Six Flags' refusal to include rides in the park.

P.T. Flagg's continued to operate until January 1, 1990, when the city took over Six Flags' 20-year lease on the property, on the grounds that the nightclub did not meet the requirements of the lease agreement. The nightclub closed with a special New Years' Eve party. Six Flags recorded a loss of $15 million during its four years of operating the building.

=== Subsequent developments ===
With the Power Plant vacated, the city of Baltimore opened up a third round of bids in August 1990 for redevelopment of the building. Organizations interested in moving into the building included the Baltimore Center for the Performing Arts and the Maryland Children's Museum.

In July 1992, a new lease was awarded to Sports Center USA, a sports-themed entertainment center to be developed by Lynda O'Dea with participation from ABC Sports and ESPN. Sports Center USA held a gala event in the vacant building in July 1993, to coincide with the MLB All-Star Game at Oriole Park at Camden Yards, but otherwise made little progress before its two-year lease expired in July 1994. The investment firm Alex. Brown & Sons, which had helped to finance the building's construction nearly a century earlier, and its chairman A. B. "Buzzy" Krongard offered a competing proposal to convert the building into offices.

In a fourth round of bids in November 1995, the city chose The Cordish Companies to redevelop the buildings into "Metropolis at the Power Plant", a mixed-use retail and entertainment complex. The first tenant in Cordish's redevelopment, Hard Rock Cafe, opened on July 5, 1997, and on the same day a footbridge was added connecting the building to the National Aquarium on the neighboring pier. Other tenants included the first ESPN Zone restaurant, which opened on July 11, 1998; a Barnes & Noble store, opened in 1998; Gold's Gym; and Maryland Art Place, a contemporary art gallery for Maryland artists, on the northwest corner.

ESPN Zone closed in June 2010 and was replaced by Phillips Seafood, which moved from nearby Harborplace. Gold's Gym closed in early 2010 and was replaced by Pandion Performance Center. Barnes & Noble closed on August 28, 2020. The Power Plant buildings also contain loft offices in the upper floors. The Cordish Companies has its headquarters on the sixth floor. The nearby Power Plant Live! nightlife complex is not located in the Power Plant buildings, but it is named after the landmark.

=== Super Cube light fixture replacement ===
In 2018, as part of the Inner Harbor 2.0 plan, the BMore Bright initiative and the Lights Out Baltimore project, the iconic Super Cube light fixtures, nicknamed "Sugar Cubes" and designed by RTKL Associates, on the Harbor Bridge Walk and the nearby Harborplace installed by The Rouse Company and The Cordish Companies in the 1980s and 1990s were replaced with 143 new wooden LED light poles designed by Structura because the original sodium light fixtures were burning out, became difficult to maintain and repair, and also caused bird migration problems due to their upward-facing position without being shielded. The new wooden LED light poles fix this by pointing downward and are shielded.

== See also ==
- Power Plant Live!
