= Nevermore Hall =

Music venue in Baltimore, Maryland, U.S.

- Location within Maryland Location within the United States
- Interactive map of Nevermore Hall
- Former names: Rams Head Live! (2004–2024)
- Address: 20 Market Place; Baltimore, Maryland; United States
- Coordinates: 39°17′22″N 76°36′26″W
- Owner: AEG LIVE (2004–2024); Baltimore Soundstage (2025–present)
- Operator: AEG LIVE (2004–2024); Live Nation Entertainment (2025–present)
- Capacity: 1,500 seats
- Type: Club
- Public transit: Shot Tower / Market Place

Construction
- Groundbreaking: 2003
- Built: 2004
- Opened: December 15, 2004; 21 years ago
- Renovated: December 2024–August 2025
- Closed: December 2024; 20 months ago (as Rams Head Live!)
- Reopened: August 2025; 12 months ago

Website
- nevermorehall.com

Nevermore Hall (formerly Rams Head Live!) is an indoor music venue, club, and bar located in Baltimore, Maryland, United States. Located in the Power Plant Live! district of downtown Baltimore, the venue is surrounded by several other bars and clubs. Rams Head Live! opened on December 15, 2004, and closed in December 2024. It reopened in August 2025 under the Nevermore Hall name, managed by the owners of nearby Baltimore Soundstage. The venue's name was derived from the Edgar Allan Poe poem "The Raven". The refreshed venue includes multiple bars, expanded VIP areas and gothic-inspired decor. Live Nation books shows for Nevermore Hall.

All Time Low became the first band to sell out the venue during their short summer tour in mid-July 2008. In an interview with Pitchfork, Queens of the Stone Age frontman Josh Homme named Rams Head Live! as one of his "favorite new venues," saying that "they treated us really good and it was really cool." In 2016, Consequence of Sound ranked Rams Head Live! at #91 on its list of "The 100 Greatest American Music Venues."
