= Fourth Street Live! =

Entertainment district in Louisville, Kentucky, U.S.

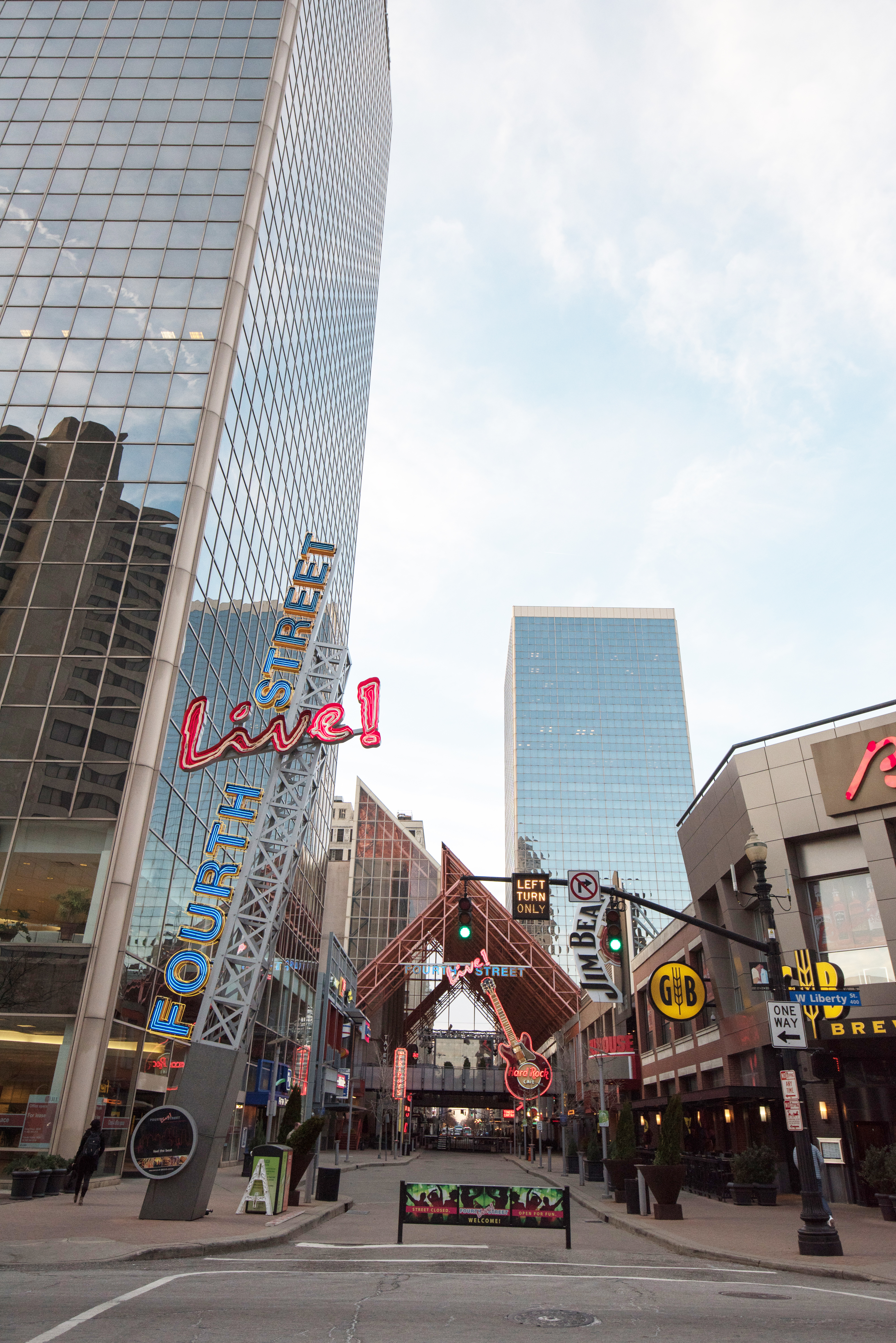
- Entrance from 4th Street and Liberty Street at sunset (August 2016)
- Interactive map of Fourth Street Live!
- Former names: Louisville Galleria (1982–2004)
- Address: 411 S. 4th Street, 40202
- Location: Louisville, Kentucky, U.S.
- Coordinates: 38°15′7″N 85°45′26″W
- Elevation: 466 feet (142 m) above sea level
- Owner: The Cordish Companies
- Operator: Live! Hospitality & Entertainment
- Type: Shopping mall (1982–2003, 2004–2011) and office complex (1982–2004, 2017–present); Entertainment venue (2004–present)
- Current use: Entertainment venue

Construction
- Groundbreaking: October 1979 (as Louisville Galleria); April 2003 (as Fourth Street Live!)
- Opened: September 29, 1982; 44 years ago (as Louisville Galleria); June 1, 2004; 22 years ago (as Fourth Street Live!); October 30, 2004; 21 years ago (remaining tenants)
- Renovated: April 2003 – June 2004; Summer–Fall 2015; May 2017 – 2018
- Expanded: May 2017 – 2018
- Closed: April 2003; 23 years ago (as Louisville Galleria)
- Architects: Skidmore, Owings & Merrill (SOM) (Louisville Galleria); Bravura Corporation (Fourth Street Live!)

Tenants
- 13 (20 at peak); Roughly 80 as Louisville Galleria

Website
- www.4thstlive.com
- Building details
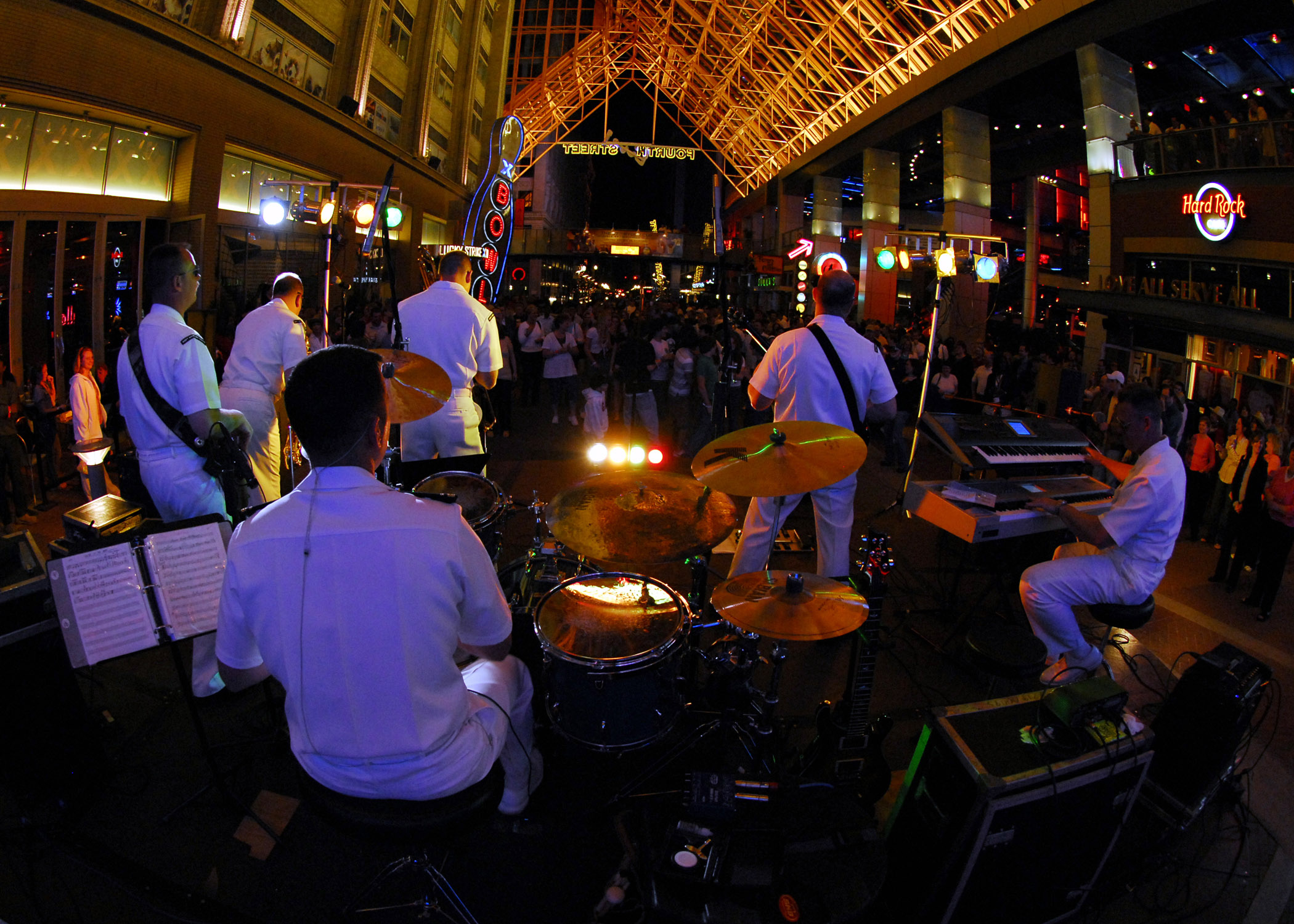
- U.S. Navy performing Freedom inside the center at night (April 20, 2007)

Technical details
- Floor count: 2 (formerly 3)
- Floor area: 350,000 square feet (33,000 m^{2})

Design and construction
- Developer: Oxford Properties

Renovating team
- Renovating firm: The Cordish Companies

Fourth Street Live! (or 4th Street Live!) is a 350,000-square-foot (33,000 m^{2}) entertainment district located on 4th Street, between Liberty Street and Muhammad Ali Boulevard, in downtown Louisville, Kentucky, United States. Fourth Street Live! first opened to the public on June 1, 2004, and all stores were completed for the grand opening on October 30, 2004. City planners hoped that the district would attract further commercial business development while providing an attractive entertainment venue for the city's hotel and tourist business as well as the local population.

Traffic on 4th Street through the complex is closed and covered for large public gatherings such as music concerts and other events. Fourth Street Live! was originally known as a failed shopping mall and office complex known as the Louisville Galleria, which opened on September 29, 1982, on the former site of River City Mall. The Cordish Companies, under an affiliate called Louisville Galleria LLC, redeveloped the mall into Fourth Street Live! from April 2003 to June 2004. The complex originally featured retail tenants, such as Borders Books and Music, until the mass closures in 2011, where Cordish eventually began "de-malling" the complex.

A 35-foot-tall neon Hard Rock Cafe guitar sign greeted visitors to Fourth Street Live! until the restaurant's closure in January 2021.

== History ==
=== Background ===
==== 1973–1996: River City Mall ====
In 1943, then-Mayor Wilson W. Wyatt suggested the idea to develop a pedestrian mall in downtown Louisville, Kentucky, as part of urban renewal amid World War II. Proposals were drafted over the years, but funding for the $1.5 million River City Mall project was not secured until 1971. Johnson, Johnson, & Roy (JJR) of Michigan designed the layout for the project, while Ryan Associated Architects worked alongside JJR to design the physical structures, kiosks, and street furniture that were placed directly on the former roadway.

The mall opened on August 3, 1973, with a ribbon-cutting ceremony, Bluegrass music from speakers, and the property being the third-largest pedestrian mall in the United States when it opened. River City Mall stretched three blocks from Liberty Street to Broadway Street, and was initially successful; in 1977, it expanded north to Market Street to connect with the new Commonwealth Convention Center (now Kentucky International Convention Center (KICC)). However, over the years, it disrupted local transit routes, cut off convenient street parking, and made it difficult for shoppers to access storefronts directly. Several department stores relocated to suburban competitors, such as Mall St. Matthews. Vehicular traffic was slowly reintroduced in 1996, and declining foot traffic scaled back, reintroducing limited vehicle lanes before permanently closing entirely that year.

==== 1982–2004: Louisville Galleria ====
Following River City Mall's failure to stop businesses from relocating to the suburbs, the City of Louisville partnered with the Canadian developer Oxford Properties and architect Skidmore, Owings & Merrill (SOM) to redevelop the site into a $130 million to $144 million shopping mall, with a seven-story glass atrium being constructed over the site of Fourth Street. Funding was supported by Oxford's investment firm and the federal government.

Louisville Galleria had its grand opening celebration on September 29, 1982, with original anchors Bacon's, Byck's, and the Galleria Cinema on the third floor, alongside a food court with businesses common in suburban malls being McDonald's, Sbarro, and TJ Cinnamon. The "Just Say No!" Arcade debuted on the third floor as well; the mall was 75% leased at the time, and an estimated 18,000 people crowded outside the glass doors for the 9:30 a.m. EDT ribbon-cutting ceremony by Governor John Y. Brown Jr.; by 11:00 a.m. EDT, that number surged past 25,000 visitors. The mall featured 339,000 square feet (31,500 m^{2}), anchored by two 27-story office towers with 415,000 square feet (38,600 m^{2}) each, making the complex feature over 1.4 million square feet (130,000 m^{2}) of office space. The historic Kaufman-Straus Building was restored during the redevelopment project.

Hazel Miller performed the city's promotional anthem, Look What We Can Do, Louisville, live inside the glass atrium of the mall during the opening celebration gala. Oxford boldly declared that the celebration was "the greatest day for Louisville in 100 years." In November of that year, one of the office towers were sold to Brown & Williamson Tobacco Corporation, interested in making it their new headquarters. The movie theater was later expanded in May 1984 to include eight screens.

Despite replacing River City Mall, the Louisville Galleria also quickly declined. In 1993, the Bacon's department store was acquired by Dillard's, and was rebranded as such; however, in December 2002, Dillard's announced that the Galleria location would permanently close in January 2003 due to underperformance. The Galleria 8-Screen Cinema closed permanently in April 2003.

=== 2001–2004: Development and opening ===
Many people crowd into the center during the frequent free concerts given by local and national performers.

Oxford Properties sold the dead mall to the City of Louisville in July 2001 for $4 million in city bonds, as part of a structured development agreement orchestrated by Mayor David L. Armstrong to rescue the failing property. To allow for redevelopment into an entertainment complex, the Galleria was immediately sold to the Baltimore, Maryland-based Cordish Companies for $1. Then, in December 2002, David S. Cordish revealed that they had secured both Hard Rock Cafe and Borders Books and Music to anchor the upcoming complex, which would be designed to mirror their successful transformation of The Brokerage to Power Plant Live! in the late 1990s and early 2000s.

The complete, $75 million scope of the redevelopment was delivered in February 2003 by newly elected Louisville Metro Mayor Jerry Abramson; the Louisville Galleria would temporarily close in April of that year to undergo a major conversion into Fourth Street Live!. Cordish's plan was to completely demolish the Galleria's massive, multi-story glass entrance walls on Liberty Street and Muhammad Ali Boulevard, and replace it with a massive, see-through overhead canopy spanning the entire length of the block, allowing the district to become a semi-outdoor pedestrian thoroughfare while still shielding visitors from rain and snow. The former food court and the 8-screen movie theater were slated for gutting, with public access to the top tier blocked off entirely to consolidate foot traffic on the first two floors. The interior second-floor shopping corridors were slated to be converted into open-air balcony terraces, designed to serve as upper-level walkways and outdoor seating for nightclubs and bars, and the Kaufman-Straus Building would be converted into 80,000 square feet (7,400 m^{2}) of modern office space. The remaining footprint of the original Galleria mall would be reconfigured into 270,000 square feet (25,000 m^{2}) of retail and dining space.

Cordish hired local architect Bravura Corporation to design the multi-layered urban streetscape, the New York-based historic preservation and urban design firm Beyer Blinder Belle, specialized in high-profile adaptive reuse projects and helped map out how to structurally separate the old Galleria components without damaging the historic Kaufman-Straus Building, and historic firm Joseph & Joseph Architects, which also supported the master planning and layout. Fourth Street Live! had its partial opening to the public on June 1, 2004, and a full grand opening on October 30, 2004.

The complex was rapidly leased, reaching 98% occupancy, creating $3 million in tax revenue annually, forming 1,500 new jobs, and over $200 million in private investment, attracting 4.2 million visitors during the debut year. Some of the original over 25 businesses at launch included Hard Rock Cafe, which had its neon guitar signage greet customers entering the complex, Borders Books and Music, Lucky Strike Lanes, Red Cheetah Nightclub, Maker's Mark Bourbon House & Lounge, and TGI Fridays. The second floor retained the original Louisville Galleria layout, housing Fourth Street Live!'s food court. This tenant mix, however, was met with mixed reactions; while 25% of the businesses were local, residents of Louisville criticized the inclusion of national chains inside a historic district.

=== 2007–2011: Early years ===
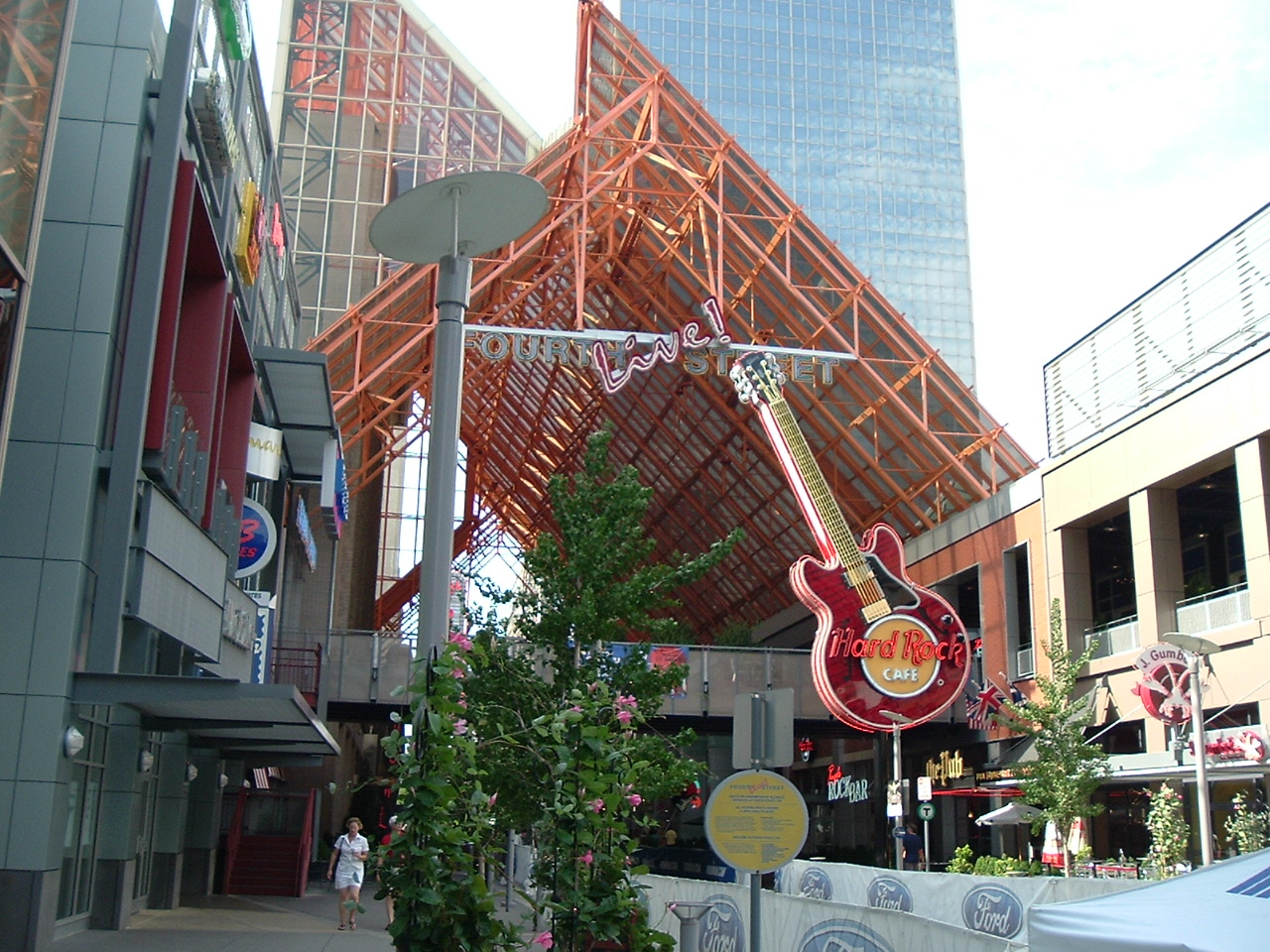
The complex in August 2007

In January 2007, Cordish attempted to evict three nightclubs (Red Cheetah, Parrot Beach and the Palm Bar) from the center, all of which were owned by the financially-troubled New Jersey-based Headliners Entertainment Group, claiming nearly $400,000 in rent and other fees were owed to the landlord. The clubs closed, and were eventually replaced with Hotel, a 10,000 sq ft (930 m^{2}) venue operated by East Coast Saloons, the same hospitality group behind the national McFadden's Restaurant and Saloon chain.

On July 2, 2007, Cordish had plans to expand the mall southward by leasing the first floor of the historic, albeit largely vacant Starks Building. Ever since the Great Recession in 2008, this Phase II proposal has been abandoned. Furthermore, Cordish was formally evicted from the Starks Building for a failure to pay rent, which triggered a local political scandal when the city allowed them to divert loans to a different project regardless. Announced March 16, 2012, Learning House would expand 45,000 sq ft (4,200 m^{2}).

Original pool hall and cigar bar tenant Felt closed and was immediately replaced with Ri Ra Irish Pub and Restaurant for over $1 million, which opened in December 2008; it was unique for Fourth Street Live!, as it operated independently rather than being a concept controlled by the Cordish Cos. Borders Books and Music closed permanently on April 4, 2011, as Borders Group filed for Chapter 11 bankruptcy two months prior and liquidated 200 locations nationwide.

Restaurants America, the corporate owner of Red Star Tavern, had completely stopped paying rent to the landlord in July 2010, according to the restaurant's general manager at the time, and as a result, Cordish filed formal eviction paperwork after the parent company went over 14 consecutive months without resolving the balance. The restaurant had to leave by October 18, 2011.

Original tenant Saddle Ridge Rock-n-Country Saloon was also experiencing financial issues, with Cordish filing a formal lawsuit. They alleged that the country lounge had fallen months behind on its leasing commitments, piling up over $130,000 in unpaid rent and fees. This happened because the business model could not bring in enough consistent daytime or weekday foot traffic to sustain the aggressive square-footage costs required by the owners. As a result, Saddle also left in October of that year, and its former space was immediately taken over by PBR Louisville.

=== 2011–2018: Restaurants and lawsuits ===
In May 2011, Cordish filed a forcible detainer eviction action in Jefferson District Court, happening after the owner of The Pub (Tavern Restaurant Group) refused to pay an explosive jump in Common Area Maintenance (CAM) fees. Cordish tried to hike the rate from $6.00 per square foot up to $17.33 per square foot. However, The Pub fired back by filing a formal civil lawsuit against Cordish in Jefferson Circuit Court, accusing the developer of overcharging them for years and wrongfully diverting their rent payments to cover arbitrary maintenance fees. The brand was unable to resolve the legal gridlock while Cordish pursued active eviction, and permanently closed its 5,000 sq ft (460 m^{2}) space on November 12, 2012. Popular Harborplace tenant The Fudgery, where workers would perform while making fudge to entertain customers, opened a 1,600 sq ft (150 m^{2}) space at Fourth Street Live! on July 27, 2012.

Italian restaurant Mozzaria occupied the 6,200 sq ft (580 m^{2}) space left by Red Star Tavern and opened to the public on May 2, 2012; however, it closed in December of that year undergo a rebranding into a new concept called Quattro. The Improv Comedy Club closed on December 10, 2012, due to economic problems after only four years of service. In November 2011, The Cordish Companies announced that the former Borders would not be replaced with another retail store, which disappointed locals. Instead, Gordon Biersch Brewery Restaurant, a German-inspired brewpub and restaurant, took over the first floor of the vacant space in 2012.

Angel's Rock Bar and Mosaic Nightclub and Lounge both closed in January 2013. Quattro opened on February 8, 2013, but abruptly shuttered two months later. A joint statement released by Chef Hillyard and the Cordish Cos. explained in December of that year that the permanent closure was due to funding problems. Ri Ra Irish Pub abruptly shut down their location on the weekend of September 21–22, 2013, for unspecified reasons. In early December 2014, Cordish's local operating affiliate, Louisville Galleria LLC, sued the operators of Ri Ra for nearly $400,000 in unpaid rent, with court documents revealing that the venue had entirely stopped paying its baseline $17,250 monthly rent in May 2013, four months prior to walking away from the property.

Cordish announced plans in 2012 to open Tavern on Fourth, but it was delayed to the summer of 2013, where the company announced that it would occupy the former spaces of Quattro, Ri Ra Irish Pub, the Improv Comedy Club, and The Pub, equaling 30,000 sq ft (2,800 m^{2}). The venue was launched by New York operator John L. Sullivan to serve as the sister location to his other major metropolitan gaming pubs, Tavern on Broad in Philadelphia and Tavern on Second in Manhattan. The 26,000 sq ft (2,400 m^{2}) attraction opened in April 2014 on the second floor of the Kaufman-Straus Building. On September 10, 2014, Smoothie King owner Ivy League Enterprises, Inc., alongside Blue Blood Enterprises, were sued by Louisville Galleria LLC for nearly $25,000 in unpaid rent, violating their lease agreement of a minimum $13,000 of yearly rent, and 10% of Smoothie King's sales and charges.

On June 26, 2015, Cordish launched a $12 million revitalization project for Fourth Street Live!, phasing out older anchors, such as Sully's Restaurant & Saloon, in favor of new concepts. Beam Suntory would absorb a 4,300 sq ft (400 m^{2}) portion on the second floor of the former Borders space to open the Jim Beam Urban Stillhouse, Bourbon Raw would utilize a 7,200 sq ft (670 m^{2}) space previously anchored by the Maker's Mark Bourbon House & Lounge, and Cleaver & Cask would occupy the 9,000 sq ft (840 m^{2}) space left by Ri Ra Irish Pub and Restaurant. Italian restaurant Birracibo was launched as a highly publicized local partnership between Cordish and Louisville Cardinals basketball legend and billionaire entrepreneur Junior Bridgeman.

Guy Fieri's Smokehouse would open on September 10, 2016. On May 8, 2017, The Cordish Companies announced that it would expand the district with the addition of Spark Louisville, a new collaborative workspace designed to replace the Tengo Sed Cantina and The Marquee Bar (which were forced to close due to lease expirations) to serve as an entrepreneurial hub. The federal wage theft lawsuit involving former workers at Cordish-affiliated venues (including Tengo Sed Cantina, Hotel, and Angel's Rock Bar) officially concluded, and Cordish-associated entities agreed to a massive $1 million settlement to pay back employees who had been illegally forced to participate in tip-pooling and perform unpaid marketing labor. Renowned local chef Edward Lee opened Whisky Dry, a high-concept burger and bourbon bar in 2018.

=== 2019–present ===
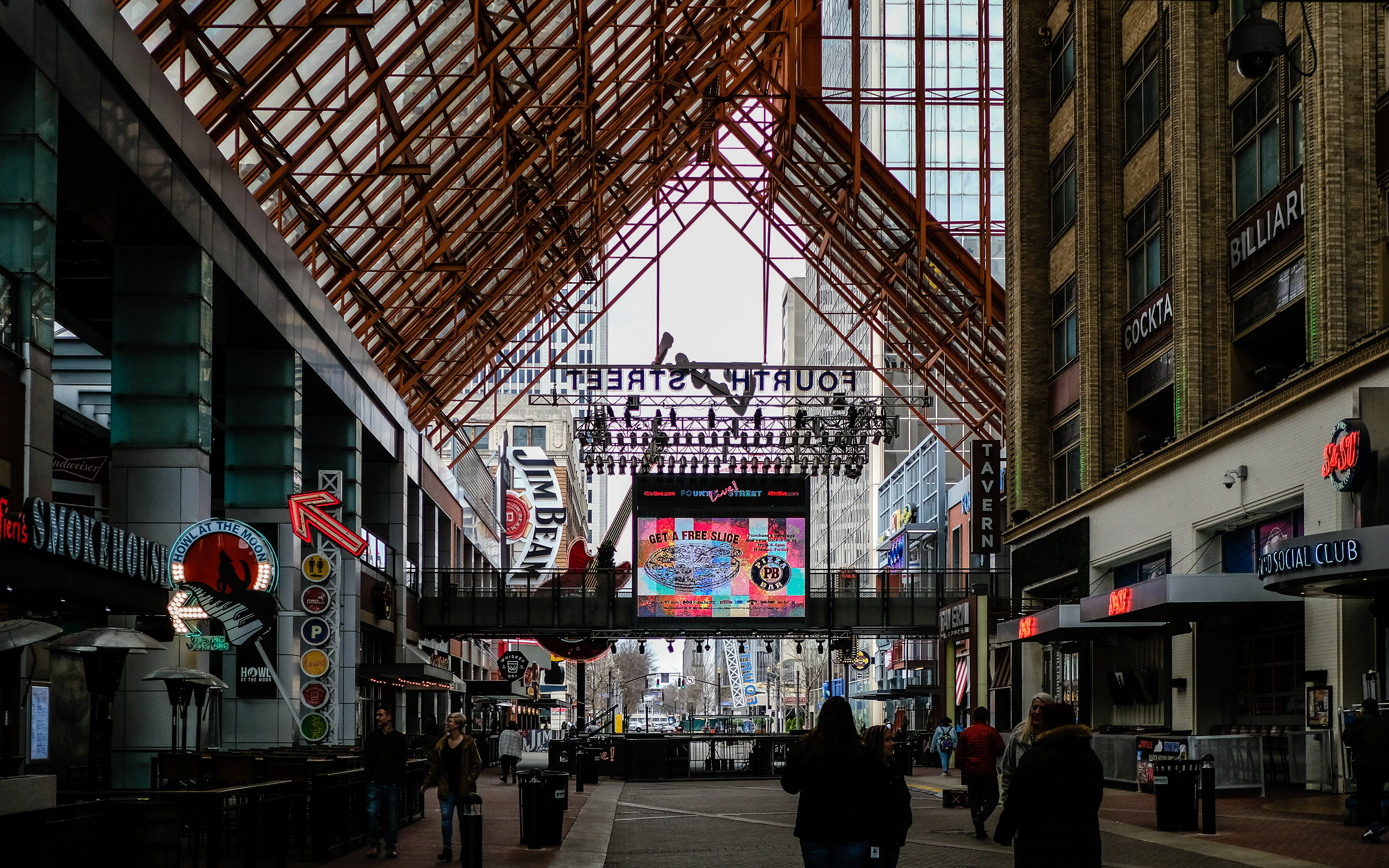
Interior view (March 2019)

The complex lost original tenant Foot Locker in January 2019 as they chose to not renew their lease. On March 11 of that year, The Cordish Companies announced that the food court on the second floor would be permanently closing, as Fourth Street Live!'s original mall-like vibe no longer fit David Cordish's vision. On December 22, 2020, original tenant Hard Rock Cafe announced that it was closing permanently in January 2021 after 16 years of operation because the parent company, Hard Rock International, stated that it has chosen not to renew its lease agreement following financial struggles from the COVID-19 pandemic, which led to the restaurant to close temporarily in March 2020. During the summer of 2020, the location was also reportedly vandalized during downtown protests.

After the restaurant shut its doors in January 2021, the iconic guitar sign at the entrance of Fourth Street Live! was removed, and the restaurant has been vacant ever since. Hard Rock International also cited they enjoyed "serving the Louisville community and playing a role in the city's dining culture," and that they were willing to operate again in Louisville if they can identify a suitable space. Additionally, the firm has been increasingly focused on casino hotels rather than standalone city cafes. Louisville Galleria LLC v. Kentucky Pub Investments, LLC continuously cycled through the Kentucky Court of Appeals (August 13, 2021), resulting in heavy financial judgments against Cordish for conversion damages and hundreds of thousands of dollars in attorney fees.

In July 2022, it was announced that a comedy club, known as Laugh Louisville, would open on the second floor of Fourth Street Live!. The tenant would have its opening on April 1, 2023 (April Fools), after having its soft opening on March 24.

TGI Fridays shut its doors on June 24, 2024, amid broader company closures due to underperformance. Scarpetta Modern Italian announced opening a 7,300 sq ft (680 m^{2}) space in the defunct Bourbon Raw space in late September 2024. Locos Latin Fusion & Nightclub closed in March 2025 due to declining foot traffic and, once again, another eviction for unpaid rent by Cordish. Gordon Biersch permanently shut its doors in July 2025 due to financial difficulties and bankruptcy corporate structurings, leaving the chain's only location to be in Myrtle Beach, South Carolina. Sports & Social would reopen on September 19, 2026, after a $1 million renovation, adding a brand new 32-foot (9.8 m) LED screen, The Tavern at Sports & Social on its second floor, and 100 additional seats to its private event spaces, including the Eagle Room, which can house up to 300 guests.

== See also ==
- List of attractions and events in the Louisville metropolitan area
