= Waterside District =

Entertainment complex in Norfolk, Virginia, U.S.

Coordinates: 36°50′40″N 76°17′29″W

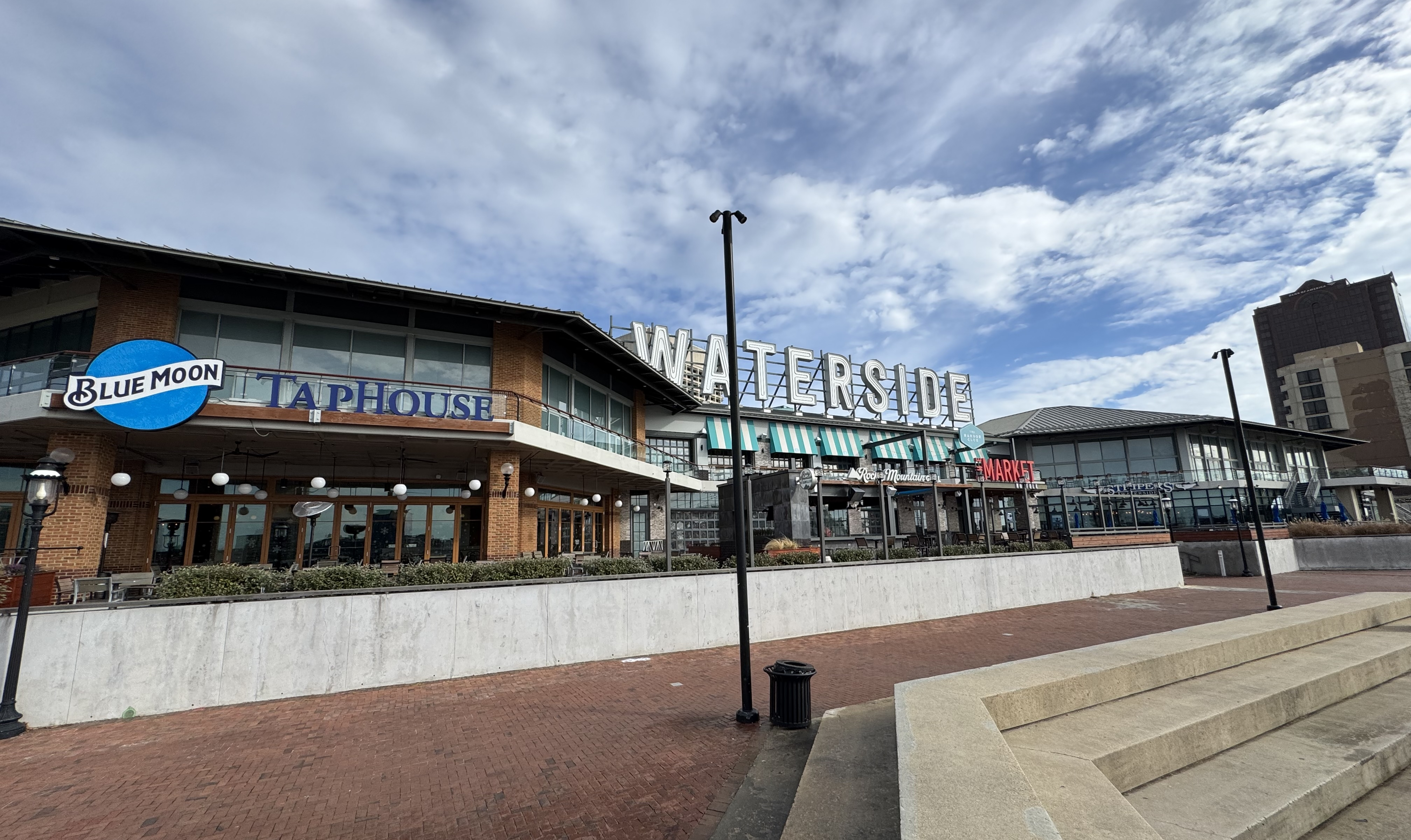
- Waterfront view (December 2024)
- Interactive map of Waterside District
- Former names: Waterside Festival Marketplace (1983–2014); Waterside Live! (planning, 2013–2015)
- Address: 333 Waterside Drive, 25310
- Location: Norfolk, Virginia, U.S.
- Elevation: 6.9–7 feet (2.1–2.1 m)
- Owner: The Cordish Companies
- Operator: Live! Hospitality & Entertainment
- Type: Festival marketplace / Shopping mall (1983–2014); Entertainment complex (2017–present)
- Current use: Entertainment complex

Construction
- Groundbreaking: August 1981 (The Waterside); August 26, 2015 (Waterside District)
- Opened: June 1, 1983; 43 years ago
- Renovated: 2014–2017
- Expanded: September 1990 (Waterside Annex)
- Closed: October 31, 2014; 11 years ago (as a festival marketplace)
- Reopened: May 11, 2017; 9 years ago
- Demolished: May 16, 2016 (Waterside Annex only)
- Years active: June 1, 1983–October 31, 2014 (as a festival marketplace); May 11, 2017–present (as an entertainment complex)
- Architect: Wallace Roberts & Todd (WRT)

Tenants
- 10-15 (120+ at peak, as a festival marketplace)

Website
- watersidedistrict.com watersidemarketplace.com at the Wayback Machine (January 2006 archive)
- Building details
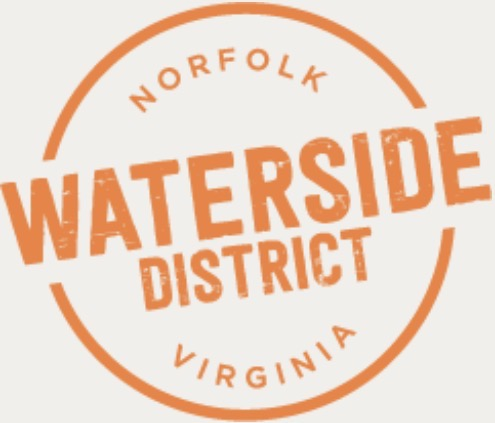

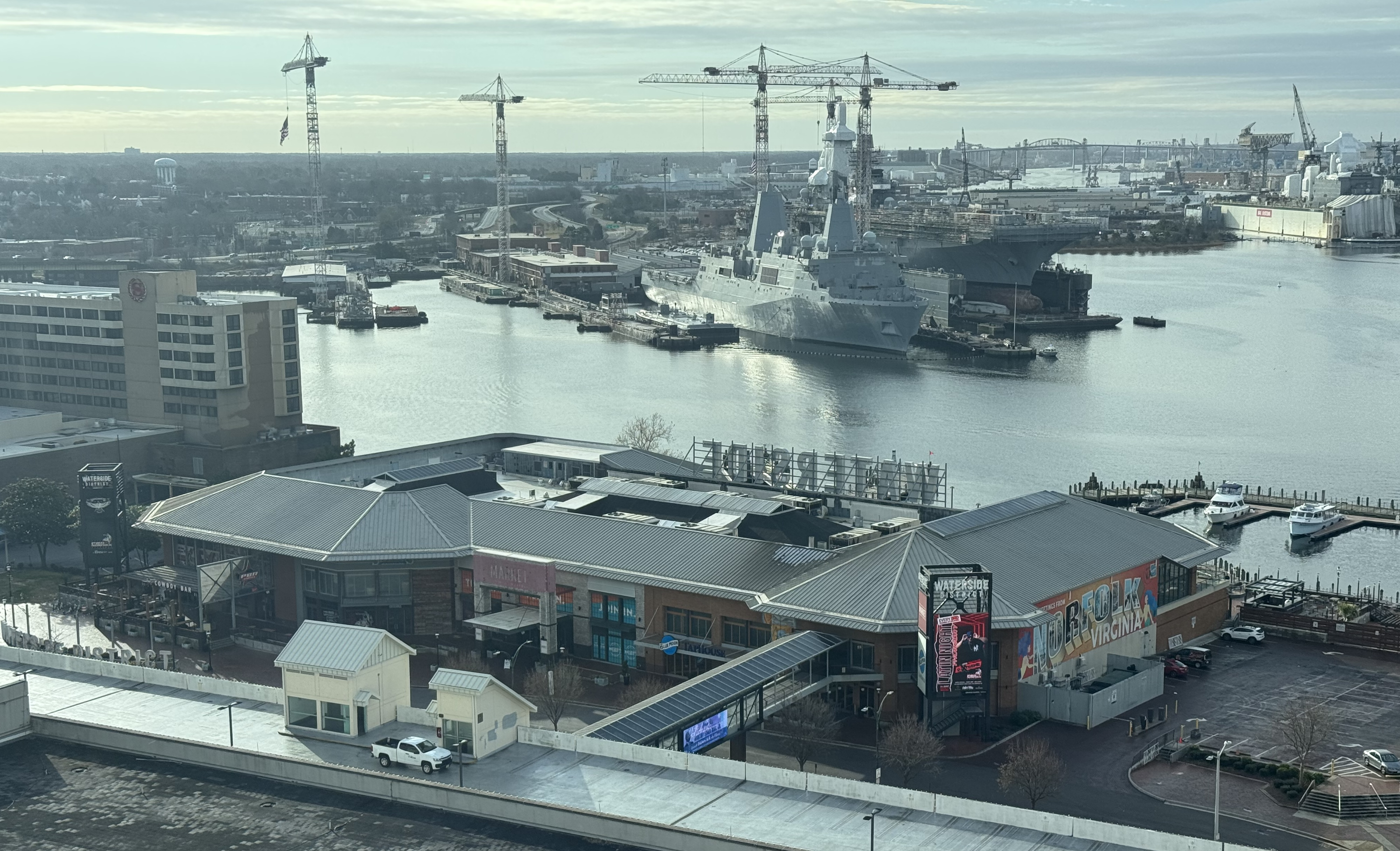
- Exterior view (December 2024)

Technical details
- Floor count: 2

Design and construction
- Developer: The Rouse Company and the Enterprise Development Company; Harvey Lindsay Commercial Real Estate
- Main contractor: Lynnhaven Marine Construction, Inc.

Renovating team
- Renovating firm: The Cordish Companies

The Waterside District is an entertainment complex adjacent to the Elizabeth River in downtown Norfolk, Virginia, United States, owned and operated by the Cordish Companies of Baltimore, Maryland.

The venue was originally Waterside Festival Marketplace (commonly referred to simply as The Waterside), developed by the Columbia, Maryland–based real estate firms The Rouse Company and the Enterprise Development Company (EDC), both founded by James W. Rouse, and local developer Harvey Lindsay Jr., under an affiliate called Waterside Associates. As its name suggests, it was a festival marketplace with popular vendors, including Phillips Seafood, Jillian's Entertainment, and later Hooters. An expansion in September 1990 added the Waterside Annex, which was demolished on May 16, 2016 as part of Cordish's redevelopment.

However, the mall later struggled, and in Halloween 2014, it temporarily closed for a major redevelopment initiated by the Cordish Companies, which "de-malled" the structure by heavily renovating it into the Waterside District, which reopened to the public on May 11, 2017. Prior to construction on the redevelopment, it was known as Waterside Live! during redevelopment planning to match sister properties, though the name was later dropped to reflect an expanded focus.

== History ==
=== 1950s–1983: Planning and construction ===
Beginning in the 1950s, Norfolk became the first city in the U.S. to receive federal funds for "slum clearance" under the Housing Act of 1949. Post-World War II suburbanization led to locals to exit downtown in favor of indoor shopping centers.

Between 1950 and 1970, thousands of acres of central Norfolk–including derelict warehouses–were razed. By May 1971, almost the entire waterfront and downtown core had been demolished, leaving behind vast "oyster shell" parking lots. To facilitate modern auto-centric travel, planners replaced old piers and wharves with a new boulevard, Waterside Drive. Beginning in the late 1970s, the Norfolk Redevelopment and Housing Authority (NRHA), formed in 1946, had appointed the Columbia, Maryland-based mall developer James W. Rouse and the Rouse Company, which had invented the festival marketplace concept for Faneuil Hall Marketplace in Boston, Massachusetts (and later Harborplace in Baltimore) as an important component to renewing a declining downtown, a seminal catalyst to further development.

The concept combined to varying degrees major restaurants, specialty retail shops, food courts and nightlife activities. To revitalize downtown Norfolk, Rouse was hired for development. Following James Rouse's retirement from the Rouse Company as CEO in 1979, he founded the Enterprise Foundation, which in turn founded the for-profit subsidiary, the Enterprise Development Company (EDC) in 1982, which was to bring the festival marketplace concept to smaller cities. The project was dubbed "Waterside", being named after the street, and was the EDC's first project. Mathias J. DeVito took over Rouse's position as CEO of the Rouse Co., who then oversaw development, licensing, and consultation for the project.

Local developer Harvey Lindsay Jr. through his firm, Harvey Lindsay Commercial Real Estate, was also involved in the development of the Waterside. Rouse and Lindsay had previously partnered for the development of the now-defunct Military Circle Mall. James Rouse had several planning names before choosing the Waterside, such as The Harborfront, Waterfront, and Market Square. The Rouse Company and Harvey Lindsay Jr. began construction of the Waterside Festival Marketplace in August 1981, which was continued through the Enterprise Development Company in 1982, under the subsidiary Waterside Associates. The mall cost $13.8 million to develop.

=== 1983–1999: Grand opening and early years ===
Waterside Festival Marketplace had its grand opening on June 1, 1983, consolidating with Harborfest Weekend, with then-governor Chuck Robb at the celebration. The opening included a parade on Waterside Drive to celebrate the new attraction. The project was an immediate success, exceeding projections by generating $340 per square foot in its first year, well above the $250 predicted. It created 1,200 jobs and added $1 million annually in new taxes. The Waterside was designed as an enclosed "mini-mall", with waffle slab ceilings and a light blue metal roof, a nod to historical market sheds. The mall was designed by the Philadelphia, Pennsylvania-based Wallace, Roberts and Todd (WRT), making it the first Rouse marketplace to not use Benjamin Thompson & Associates, Inc. as the architect.

Original tenants of the Waterside included Phillips Seafood (which operated at the mall as Phillips Waterside), Hofheimer's Shoes 'N' Such, Crabtree & Evelyn, Scantastic, and The Fudgery, where people would sing and perform to entertain guests while making fudge. 100,000 people attended opening day to see and go to the 122 stores and restaurants. The Waterside has evolved through numerous business cycles. Originally, it featured mostly restaurants like The Baitshack on the first floor, and an Italian restaurant called II Porto. There were small nautically themed stores, as well as Jillian's Entertainment. The balconied second floor featured more niche stores and kiosks. Overall, the original 1983 structure featured 77,000 square feet (7,200 m^{2}) of space dedicated to restaurants, retail shops, and gift shops. In 1989, the City of Norfolk and the Enterprise Development Co. announced an expansion, which was added to the complex involving the addition of the Waterside Annex and the opening of Hooters in June 1997. The expansion was dubbed Waterside II. The mid-1990s saw a decline in business, exacerbated by the 1999 opening of nearby MacArthur Center.

Additionally, The Virginian-Pilot noted that Waterside lost national retailers in June 1997, including Häagen-Dazs. The mall's tenants were blaming Enterprise and the city for its decline. Phillips Waterside announced in August 1997 that it would likely close its doors in May 1998 because of underperformance, and that its lease would expire by that day. Specifically, the company stated that it would depart if a replacement tenant opened in its space. While a closure was likely, and the restaurant's operator, Steve Phillips, could not be reached, a Phillips executive confirmed that the restaurant would not leave. As of 2014, Phillips Waterside is no longer open.

The Norfolk Redevelopment and Housing Authority purchased the Waterside from its private owner, Enterprise Real Estate Services, a subsidiary of the Enterprise Foundation, in 1999, at the time considered a temporary arrangement.

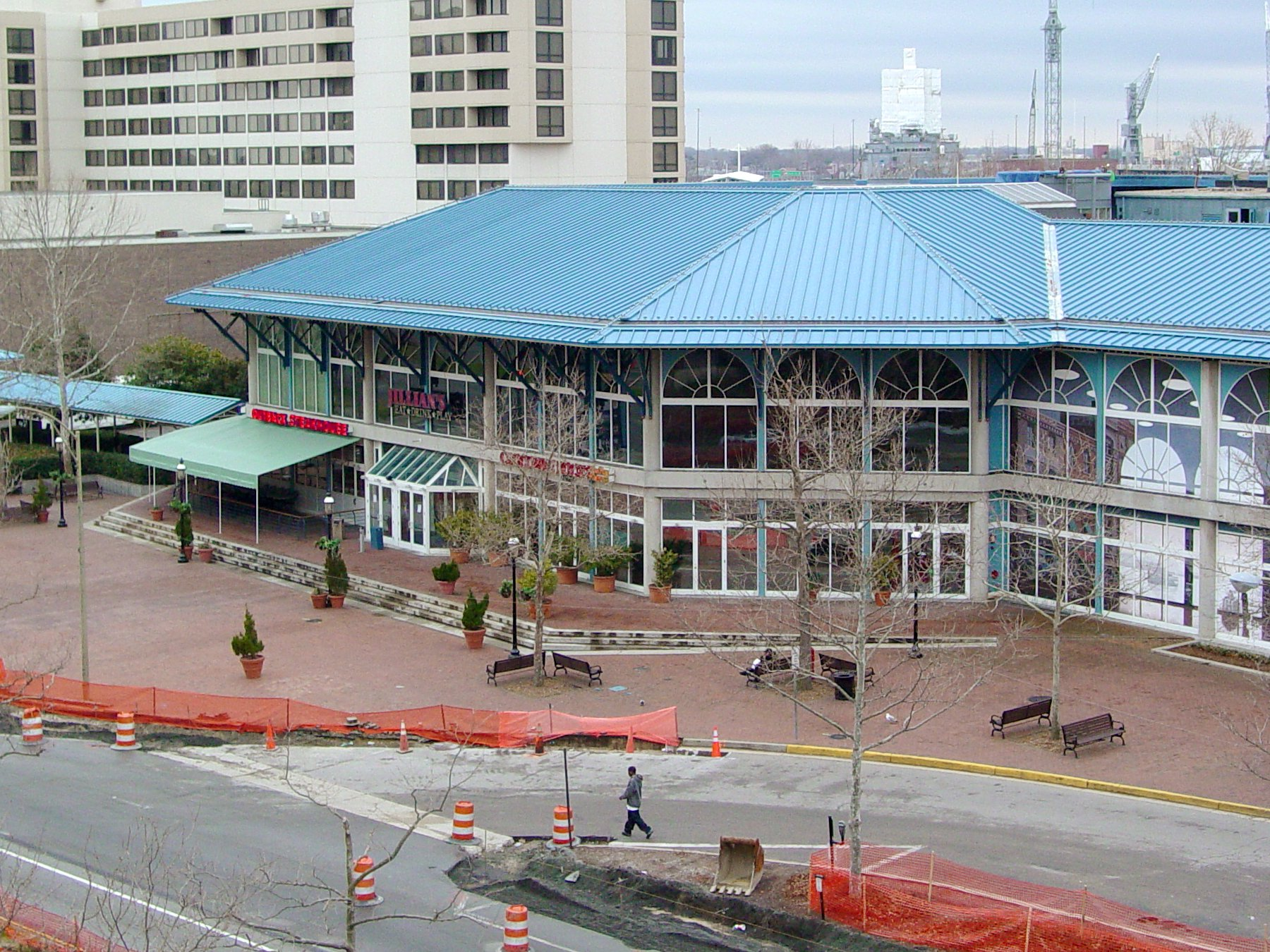
Waterside Festival Marketplace in March 2003

=== 2000s–2014: Decline and closure ===
The NRHA attempted to revitalize Waterside in the early 2000s. The upstairs stores were replaced by entertainment venues. Jillian's closed permanently in May 2010.

The Waterside delivered approximately $2.2 million in tax revenue in 2007, down $300,000 since 2004. Norfolk subsidized the facility with $1 million in 2008 for studying the next phase of the marketplace's repositioning.

=== Redevelopment as Waterside District ===
By the early 2010s, the Waterside was effectively a dead mall. It was almost completely empty by 2013, leading to discussions about redevelopment beginning. The mall was over 95% vacant, with only Hooters and The Fudgery still standing. Following the lack of visitors and high vacancies, The Waterside officially closed its doors on October 31, 2014, and the remaining tenants were sent eviction notices. The City of Norfolk and The Cordish Companies held a groundbreaking ceremony on the new Waterside District on August 26, 2015. The new venue would retain the footprint of the old Waterside (excluding the Annex).

Cordish originally planned for the redeveloped Waterside to be called Waterside Live!, but it was shortly changed to Waterside District to better reflect the marketplace's "de-mallification". Blake Cordish, the vice president of The Cordish Companies, stated:

We are excited to announce that we see a larger vision for this important site that is more than a Live! district, but ultimately a broader mixed-use, waterfront district, and the name, the Waterside District, speaks to that potential. This is exactly the approach we took in phased, mixed-use developments like Ballpark Village in St. Louis, Missouri and the Power & Light District in Kansas City, Missouri which has proved extremely successful.

— Blake Cordish, vice president of The Cordish Cos.

The Waterside Annex was razed on May 16, 2016 because the city thought that the Annex "should've never been built" due to causing accessibility problems and blocking views of the waterfront from the Elizabeth River. The redevelopment also involved the complete gutting of Waterside's original 1980s interior, replacing outdated lighting with modern LED lighting, new flooring and ceilings, and repainting the Waterside's blue roof to black for a more commercial appearance, following Cordish's "Live!" concept, similar to Power Plant Live! in Baltimore.

Waterside District's grand opening took place on May 11, 2017. The new tenants for Waterside District include Blue Moon Taphouse, PBR Norfolk A Coors Banquet Bar, Luk Fu, PDS Street Tacos, Harbor Club, Rocky Mountain Grill, and a renovated The Fudgery. A critical component of Norfolk's ongoing post-World War II revitalization, the complex connects via a cross-street pedestrian bridge to a parking garage, sits at the foot of the Portsmouth Ferry terminal, and connects via a waterfront promenade to the downtown, the nearby baseball stadium (Harbor Park), naval museum (Nauticus) and waterfront neighborhood of Freemason Harbor.

The venue hosted the traveling SkyStar Wheel from May 19, 2018 to August 19, 2018. The Waterside District is anchored by The Market, a 30,000-square-foot (2,800 m^{2}) premier food hall and entertainment hub, referred to by locals and The Cordish Cos. as the "living room of Norfolk." It serves as a central gathering place featuring curated culinary options, a massive 25-foot LED screen for sports, and a stage for live music and festivals. At 9 p.m. ET on Fridays and Saturdays, Waterside District transforms into an adult-only nightclub.

=== Fall 2025 shooting ===
A 23-year-old known as Lorne Bailey Jr. was arrested in Hampton, Virginia in connection with a shooting that occurred on November 23, 2025, near the district, which also caused $1000 in damages to the Waterside District's pedestrian bridge. It was also found that Bailey intended to shoot four other people.

== See also ==
- Harborplace
- Power Plant Live!
- Imagination Station
- Downtown Norfolk, Virginia
