= Shaarei Tfiloh Synagogue =

Orthodox synagogue in Maryland, US

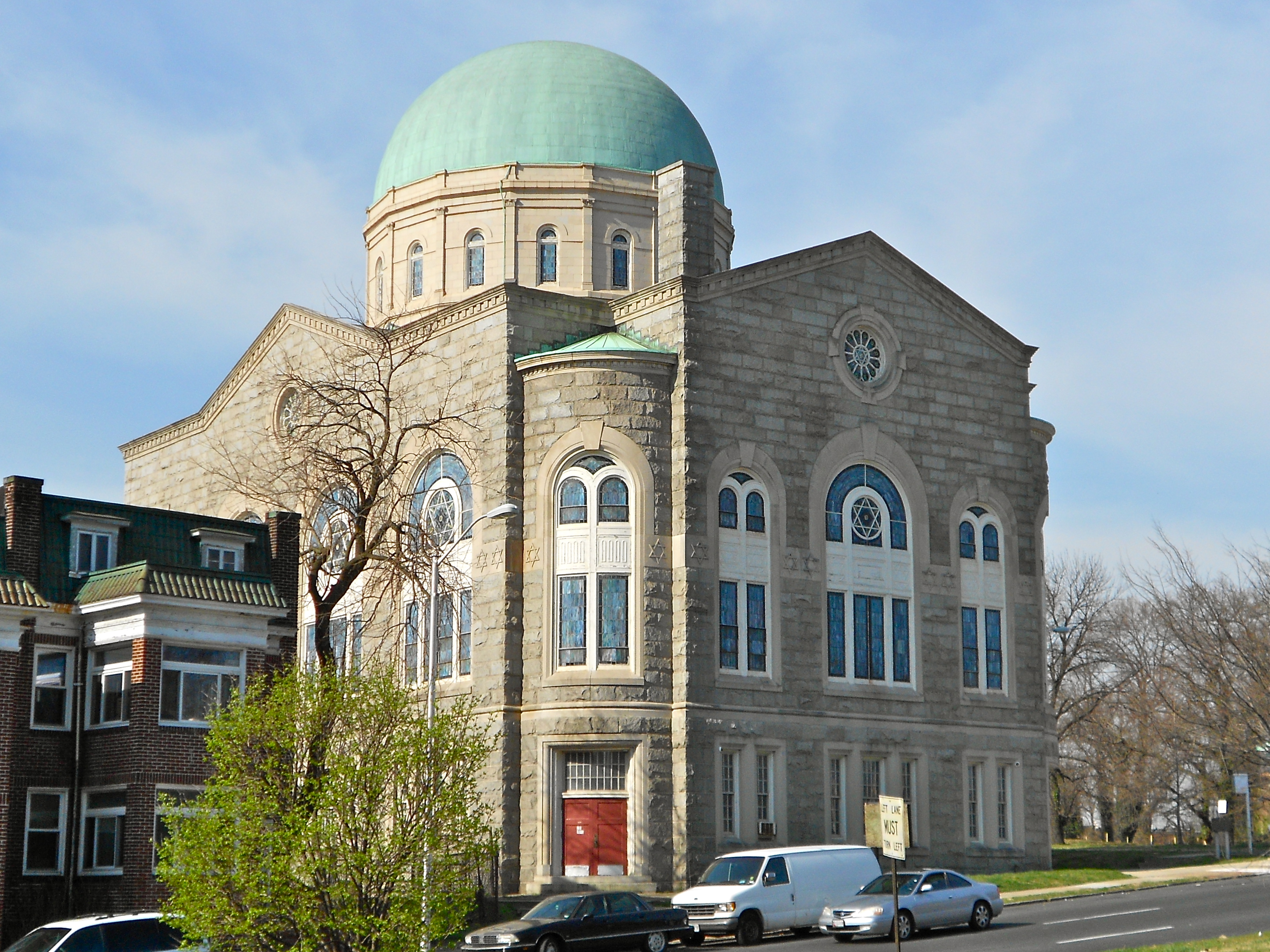
- Shaarei Tfiloh Synagogue, 2012

- Location in Baltimore

Religion
- Affiliation: Orthodox Judaism (former)
- Ecclesiastical or organisational status: Synagogue (1921–2023)
- Leadership: Rabbi David E. Herman (former)
- Status: Closed (2023)

Location
- Location: 2001 Liberty Heights Avenue, Baltimore, Maryland 21217
- Country: United States
- Coordinates: 39°19′11″N 76°39′4″W

Architecture
- Architect: Stanislaus Russell
- Type: Synagogue
- Style: Classical Revival
- Groundbreaking: 1921
- Completed: 1927
- Construction cost: US$285,000

Specifications
- Capacity: 1,000 worshippers
- Dome: 1
- Materials: Stone; copper; glass
- Shaarei Tfiloh Synagogue
- U.S. National Register of Historic Places
- Area: less than one acre
- NRHP reference No.: 96001085
- Added to NRHP: October 10, 1996

Shaarei Tfiloh Synagogue (transliterated from Hebrew as "Gates of Prayer"), also known as the Shul in the Park, is a former Orthodox Jewish congregation and synagogue located on Druid Hill Park at 2001 Liberty Heights Avenue, Baltimore, Maryland, in the United States. Completed in 1927, in September 2023 it was reported that the synagogue had closed.

Shaarei Tfiloh Synagogue was listed on the National Register of Historic Places in 1996. The synagogue is significant due to its association with the immigration of Russian and Eastern European Jews to Baltimore. It is a rock-faced stone structure with large arched stained glass windows and a pedimented roofline surmounted by a central copper-clad dome.

== History ==
The synagogue was designed by architect Stanislaus Russell and built on a budget on $250,000. The cornerstone of the Shaarei Tfiloh Synagogue was laid on July 10, 1921. Constructed from 1921 and 1927 for $285,000, it is one of the oldest functioning synagogue buildings in Maryland. It holds 700 men and 300 women. The synagogue has a turquoise dome, stained glass windows, and a sanctuary with a balcony for women's seating.

Its first president was Louis Cordish, father of state politician Paul L. Cordish.

Rabbi Nathan Drazin was installed as Rabbi in 1934.

== Religious services ==
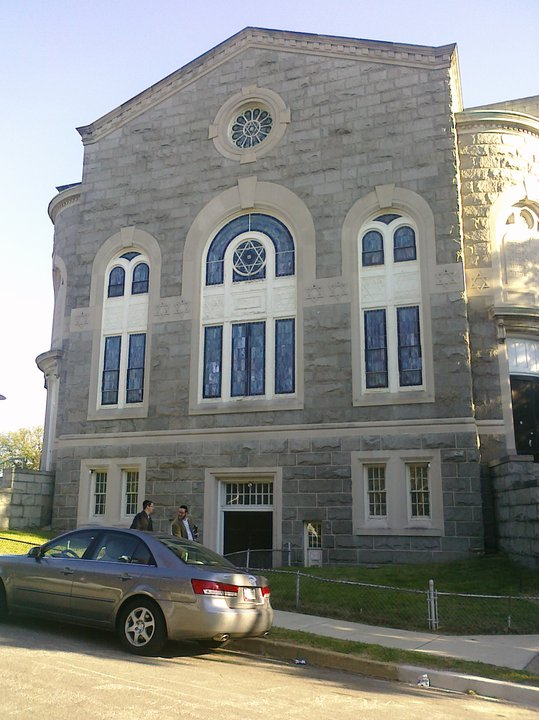
Shaarei Tfiloh Synagogue, 2010

At the time the synagogue was built, the surrounding "Park Circle" area was a thriving Jewish community. However, the Jewish community moved away from the neighborhood during the 1960s, primarily to Upper Park Heights, Randallstown, Pikesville, and Owings Mills. Eventually the synagogue ceased regular Sabbath (Saturday) services and only conducted services on the Jewish High Holy Days.

Beginning in the mid-2000s, the synagogue started conducting one "weekday" service a week, on Sunday mornings, in an effort to re-invigorate it, although Sabbath services are still not conducted. The synagogue is also occasionally used for special events (such as weddings) and as a location for "period" photography. It appeared in the 1999 movie Liberty Heights.

The synagogue conforms to Orthodox teachings and practices, and welcomes all as worshipers and members, regardless of personal affiliation.

As of 2011 Howard Perlow and David Cordish were the co-presidents and David E. Herman was the rabbi.

== Third Space at Shaarei Tfiloh ==
After restorations of the building, a new organization took over the building called Third Space at Shaarei Tfiloh. The center is envisioned to be a space for arts, culture and learning. The term 'third place' was coined by Ray Oldenberg, as space that isn't home or work.

== Cemetery ==
The Shaarei Tfiloh Congregation Cemetery is located on 5800 Windsor Mill Road.

== See also ==
- History of the Jews in Maryland
