= Power Plant Live! =

Entertainment district in Baltimore, Maryland, U.S.

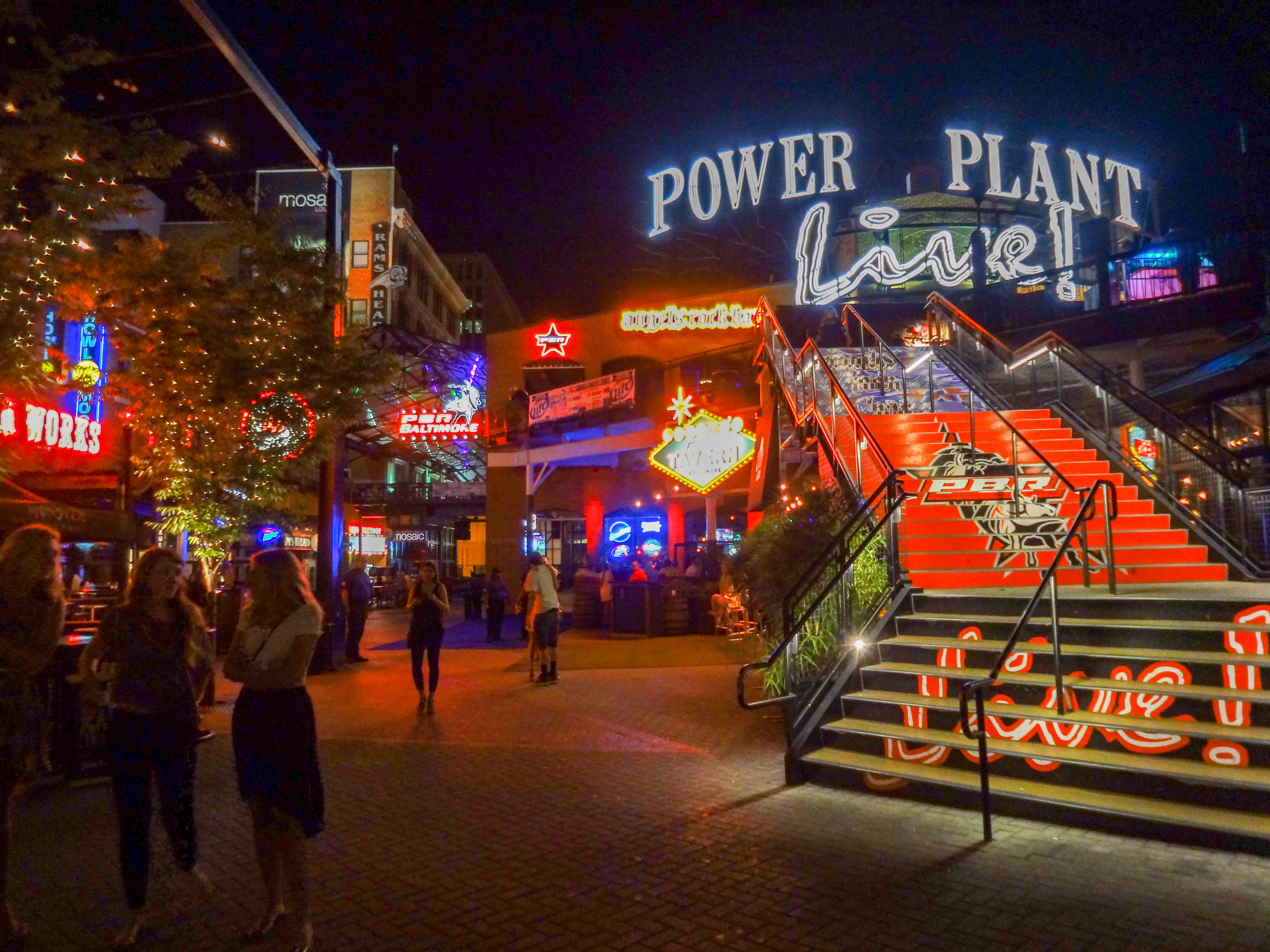
- Exterior view at night (September 2013)
- Interactive map of Power Plant Live!
- Former names: The Brokerage (1982–1999)
- Address: 34 Market Place
- Location: Baltimore, Maryland, United States
- Coordinates: 39°17′22″N 76°36′26″W
- Elevation: 25–30 feet (7.6–9.1 m) above sea level
- Owner: The Cordish Companies
- Operator: Live! Hospitality & Entertainment
- Capacity: ≈1,600 seats (approx. 1,000 in Baltimore Soundstage)
- Type: Mixed-use (1983–1999); Entertainment venue (2001–present)
- Current use: Entertainment venue
- Public transit: Shot Tower / Market Place

Construction
- Groundbreaking: Early 1980s (as The Brokerage); Early 2001 (as Power Plant Live!)
- Opened: June 15, 1982; 44 years ago (as The Brokerage); July 4, 2001; 25 years ago (as Power Plant Live!) (Note: While some sources state that it opened in 1999, official sources, such as Baltimore Sun, state a 2001 opening.)
- Renovated: December 1999 – July 2001
- Closed: December 1999; 26 years ago (as The Brokerage)
- Demolished: Early 2001 (partial)
- Years active: 1983–1999 (as The Brokerage); 2001–present (as Power Plant Live!)

Tenants
- 13 (20+ at peak); Roughly 35–40 as The Brokerage

Website
- www.powerplantlive.com
- Building details

Technical details
- Floor count: 2
- Floor area: 550,000 square feet (51,000 m^{2})

Design and construction
- Developer: Morton Macks

Renovating team
- Renovating firm: The Cordish Companies

Other information
- Parking: Valet parking from Thursdays–Saturdays; Harbor Park Garage at 55 Market Place

Power Plant Live! is a 550,000-square-foot (51,000 m^{2}) entertainment district in the Inner Harbor section of Downtown Baltimore, Maryland. It includes a collection of restaurants, bars, retail, and a ≈1,600 seats music venue. Originally a failed mixed-use development known as The Brokerage, built on the former site of the Baltimore Centre Market, the original complex was redeveloped by the Cordish Companies and opened in phases during 2001, 2002, and 2003.

The complex gets its name from the nearby "Power Plant" (Pratt Street Power Plant) building, three blocks south on municipal Pier 4 on East Pratt Street facing the Inner Harbor, which was also later redeveloped by Cordish. It is home to the Baltimore Soundstage, which has approximately 1,000 seat capacity. It includes local restaurants, such as Underground Pizza, Luckie's Tavern, Mosaic Nightclub, and PBR Baltimore, and was the first "Live!" development by the Cordish Companies. It also includes adjacent music venues, being Nevermore Hall (formerly Rams Head Live! until December 2024) and formerly, Tin Roof Baltimore (closed in May 2024).

The complex is located along Market Place and is served by the Baltimore Metro SubwayLink's Shot Tower / Market Place station.

== History ==
=== Background ===
Power Plant Live! was built on the former site of the Baltimore Centre Market and the Brokerage Mall, and is adjacent to the Port Discovery Children's Museum (formerly Baltimore Wholesale Fish Market, and a similarly failed redevelopment known as the Fishmarket Mall).

==== 1730–1984: Baltimore Centre Market ====
The original Centre Market at East Baltimore Street (formerly Long Street when the town was laid out in 1730, and later known as Market Street, recognizing the important place that it led to in the east), south to Water Street (former original shoreline of the harbor Basin in colonial times) and east of South Frederick Street (alley) to the adjacent Jones Falls stream. It was also traditionally known as the Marsh Market because of being on the site of the old Thomas Harrison's Marsh on the western banks of the Jones Falls during the colonial era 18th and early 19th centuries which separated old Baltimore Town from the neighboring village of Jonestown to the northeast across the Falls - spanned by a vital link in early 18th century local commerce and growth, a wooden bridge which was built which resulted in the naming of Bridge Street (later to be renamed North Gay Street, after a local family) and led to the merger of the two villages by 1745. Here in 1763, the first public market house for both merged towns was constructed and became the most important center for commerce resulting in its original name of Centre Market.

The marketplace was destroyed by the Great Baltimore Fire of February 7–8, 1904. Following the fire, the City of Baltimore cleared the debris and completely replaced it by constructing three large, modern wholesale brick market buildings (the Fish, Produce, and Retail markets) between 1906 and 1907. The final operational pieces of this market system officially closed down and were vacated in 1984, when the city's commercial seafood and distribution hub moved out of downtown to the Maryland Wholesale Seafood Market (also known as the Maryland Market Center) in Jessup, Maryland. Immediately after the 1984 closure, the retail and produce market structures were gutted and demolished to clear the land for modern development, leaving only the Wholesale Fish Market building standing.

==== 1982–1999: The Brokerage ====
Most of the historic markets were redeveloped into The Brokerage, a shopping mall and department store that opened to the public on June 15, 1982, established by Morton Macks, a local developer. To avoid competition from nearby Harborplace & The Gallery, the mall was designed to feature few restaurants. It featured a multi-level layout, an integrated 276-car parking garage, and an attached corporate office annex at the southeastern edge of the block.

The mall focused heavily on luxury retail to target blue-collar and wealthy Baltimore locals, and was explicitly modeled after Washington D.C.'s The Shops at Georgetown Park. They recruited high-end national and regional clothing brands, including Benetton, Cashache, Elaine's, and Lineia Peta, a Georgetown retailer that cited that 30% of its existing revenue already came from traveling Baltimore residents. The price points ranged from medium to exceptionally high.

The Brokerage was initially operated by Sovereign Realty 1983-XVIII Limited Partnership, which defaulted on a $53 million commercial loan after over-leveraging the development. This led to the Bank of America to foreclose on the property in January 1991, with bank's real estate disposal subsidiary, BA Properties Inc., taking control of the dead mall for an $8 million bid at public auction. However, they failed to find a private buyer for nearly two years. In December 1992, the Baltimore Board of Estimates, and the Baltimore Development Corporation (BDC) stepped in to clear the bad debt. The city used $5 million in voter-approved off-street parking general obligation bonds to buy the entire 3-acre (1.2 ha) complex outright from Bank of America to control the land for future use.

=== 1990s–2003: Development and opening ===
After then-Mayor William D. Schaefer had moved on in that year to become Governor of Maryland, a new redevelopment proposal by Cordish Company for the Baltimore Centre Market/Brokerage Mall site was considered by expansion from the recent Power Plant amusement and retail complex on Pratt Street's old Pier IV and the Inner Harbor.

The redevelopment of the site surrounding the historic Pratt Street Power Plant into Power Plant Live! was initiated in the late 1990s by the Cordish Companies, aligning with broader urban renewal initiatives in Baltimore to revitalize the Inner Harbor area, which included Harborplace and The Gallery in July 1980 and September 1987 respectively, the Baltimore Convention Center in August 1979, and the Pratt Street Power Plant itself. The project focused on transforming two vacant city blocks into a mixed-use entertainment district, building on the success of Cordish's earlier adaptive reuse of the adjacent Power Plant building in the early 1990s.

In partnership with the City of Baltimore, Cordish pursued multiple necessary entitlements, including a 99-year ground lease, and a rare arena liquor license that allowed patrons to carry drinks throughout the complex, enabling an open-air, pedestrian-friendly design that was different from traditional malls. The Brokerage closed its doors in December 1999 to allow for the redevelopment; it would cost $10 million to "de-mall" The Brokerage. The nearby nine-screen UA The Movies at Harbor Park theater at 55 Market Place, initially operated by United Artists Theatre Circuit, abruptly closed permanently on March 28, 2000; Reed S. Cordish publicly stated that it would "make sense" to make the former cinema part of the under-construction Power Plant Live!; however, this never came in fruition, and the former cinema was ultimately converted into a campus facility for the Baltimore City Community College (BCCC) and a shopping center known as The Shops at Harbor Park in September 2001.

The project was titled "Power Plant Live!". The "Power Plant" portion of the name had come from after the nearby Pratt Street Power Plant also redeveloped by Cordish, while the "Live!" portion refers to Cordish's idea of creating an entertainment district to continue bringing people back to the Inner Harbor, inspired by the 18 million visitors drawn by the early years of Harborplace, exceeding Walt Disney World. Portions of The Brokerage would be preserved, while others would be torn down, converting the failed complex into an open-air entertainment district. The Cordish Companies began construction of Power Plant Live! in early 2001, and the project cost approximately $35 million. Cordish focused on minimal disruption on surrounding areas, as well as testing market viability.

Phase I of Power Plant Live! had its grand opening celebration on July 4, 2001. It was equipped with an outdoor bar, large video screen, and nightly sound-and-light shows to draw crowds of tourists and visitors. It was considered the focal point of the redevelopment, and designed as a 30,000-square-foot (2,800 m^{2}) brick plaza. Subsequent phases from through 2002 and 2003 added additional bars, restaurants, and performance venues, culminating the Power Plant Live! plaza into the full 550,000-square-foot (51,000 m^{2}) complex by late 2003 and establishing it as a complete "live, work, and play" environment, with nightlife.

=== After opening ===
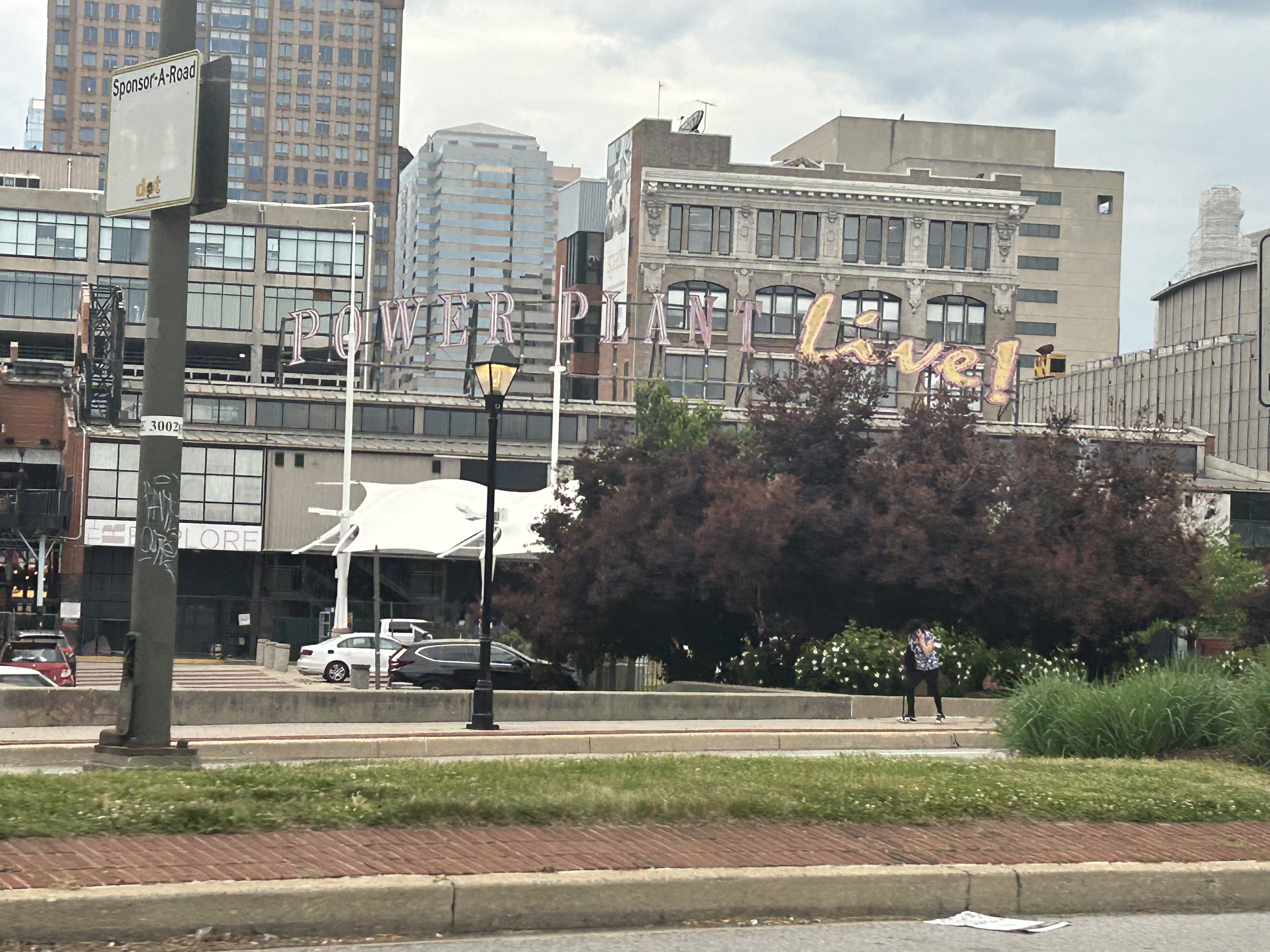
Exterior view from President Street (May 2026)

Mondo Bondo Italian Bistro opened at the complex in the summer of 2001. Lucille's Cajun Grill opened in late spring of 2003, replacing Bill Bateman's Bistro, which closed permanently earlier that year. Following Power Plant Live!'s success, it served as a prototype for later "Live!" developments by Cordish, such as Fourth Street Live! in Louisville, Kentucky, Live! Casino & Hotel Maryland at Arundel Mills in Hanover, Maryland, Stateside Live! in Philadelphia, Pennsylvania, and Waterside District in Norfolk, Virginia.

Blue Sea Grill, operated by Big Steaks Management, opened in April 2004, replacing Cafe Asia. The Improv Comedy Theatre closed abruptly in late August 2005. Lucille's also closed its doors on November 23 of that year, after just over two years in business. The owners, who also owned Mondo Bondo, cited a hefty $20,000 monthly rent and a slow winter dinner crowd as the primary reasons for shutting down. Shortly after, MEX (operating as MEX Baltimore), a vibrant, mid-priced Tex-Mex restaurant and margarita bar, took over the vacant space.

Blue Sea Grill permanently closed its doors on August 29, 2009. Its parent company, Big Steaks Management LLC, made the decision to close both the seafood spot and its nearby sister concept, Babalu Grill, to consolidate their business and refocus corporate energy onto their more profitable brands, specifically the Havana Club and Ruth's Chris Steak House locations. The vacant space was taken over by Tatu Asian Bar & Grill in December 2010. Announced in February 2011, Baltimore Comedy Factory would relocate from Light Street to the former Improv Comedy Theatre space, with a larger area of 6,600 sq ft (610 m^{2}) within the complex to enhance its food service and nightly capacity. A major $10 million to $11 million renovation was initiated by The Cordish Companies to mark Power Plant Live!'s 10th anniversary. OpenAire designed and added a 50-foot-high glass and polycarbonate canopy roof over the central outdoor plaza alleyway, shielding event-goers from rain while preserving an open-air atmosphere.

Announced on May 11, 2011, Leinenkugel's Beer Garden, a multi-seasonal beer hall, would be built into a new 3,500 sq ft (330 m^{2}) glass-and-steel pavilion as part of the renovations. A 9-by-12-foot Jumbotron LED video screen was permanently anchored above the stage area to broadcast live sporting events, Baltimore Orioles and Baltimore Ravens watch parties, and high-production concert visuals. The broken fountain at Power Plant Live! was fixed.

New tenants included PBR Baltimore and an expansion of the Luckie's Tavern sports bar on the second floor of the district. Reed S. Cordish, the vice president of the Cordish Companies, stated "It's building upon an existing strength and taking it to a new level." On March 2, 2015, Cordish announced a plan to add 20,000 square feet (1,900 m^{2}) of office space, known as Spark Baltimore, inside the upper floors of the Bernstein Building, opening its first phase on January 11, 2016. By August 3, 2018, Spark featured 70,000 square feet (6,500 m^{2}) of coworking space. Initially, when the plans were announced, DreamIt had a lease of 4,500 sq ft (420 m^{2}), while Mission Tix, which had a new space on the third level, increased its lease.

Power Plant Live! hit 100% occupancy on June 17, 2026.

== Adjacent facilities ==
=== Nevermore Hall (formerly Rams Head Live!) ===
Rams Head Live! had its grand opening on December 15, 2004, attracting nearly 10 million visitors. It was 1,600-capacity concert hall, spanning 26,000 square feet (2,400 m^{2}) across three viewing levels, and has hosted national touring acts, equipped with advanced sound and lighting systems for diverse genres. Rams Head Live! was developed via a collaboration involving the Cordish Companies and Rams Head Group, a restaurant and entertainment company based in Annapolis, Maryland. However, Rams Head Live! closed its doors in December 2024, with AEG LIVE informing Cordish that they were leaving the district. Following this, Cordish renovated the building in partnership with Live Nation Entertainment, reopening Rams Head Live! in August 2025 under the new branding Nevermore Hall.

=== Tin Roof (2014–2024) ===
Tin Roof at Power Plant Live! was a lively, casual venue, featuring live music, a BBQ-focused menu, and a fun, often crowded atmosphere with karaoke. It opened during Memorial Day weekend in 2014, replacing Kettle Hill, which shuttered in 2012. It was the Nashville, Tennessee-based chain's first location in Baltimore.

However, Tin Roof itself ultimately closed its doors from May 4-5, 2024, because the owners chose not to renew their lease for unspecified reasons.

==== Replacement ====
After over a year of being vacant, Geno's Steaks, a Philadelphia-based cheesesteak restaurant, announced in October 2025 that it would open in the former Tin Roof space. On February 4, 2026, the restaurant announced that it was scheduled to have its grand opening in early March. The restaurant opened for business on March 5, 2026.

== See also ==
- Pratt Street Power Plant
- Nevermore Hall
- The Cordish Companies
