= Fashion Outlets of Niagara Falls =

Fashion Outlets Niagara Falls
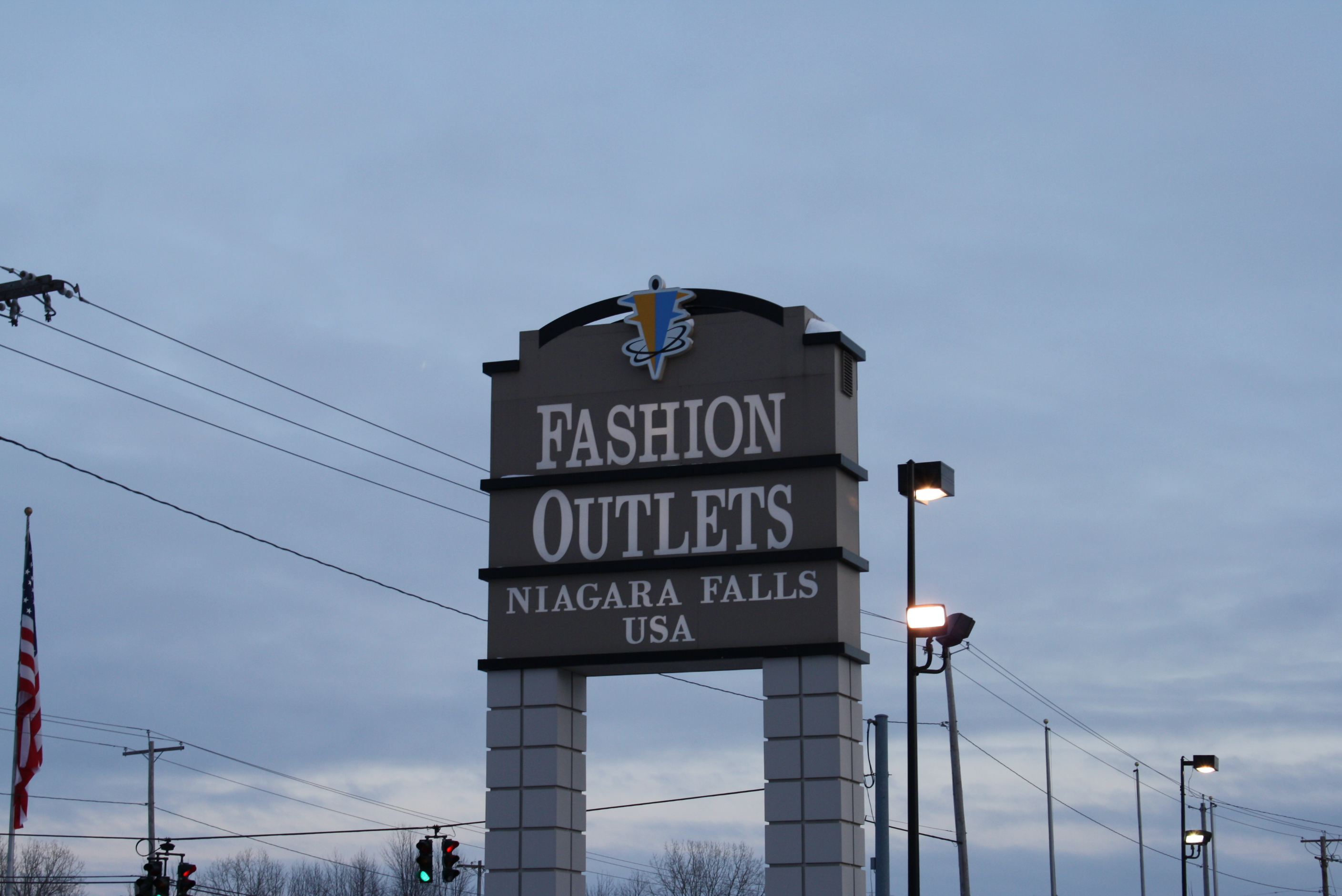
- Location: Niagara Falls, New York, United States
- Coordinates: 43.09773°N 78.97974°W
- Opened: July 19, 1982
- Owner: Macerich
- Num. of stores: 165
- Num. of anchor tenants: 2
- Floor area: 700,000 square feet (65,032.1 m^{2})
- Floors: 1
- Website: fashionoutletsniagara.com

Fashion Outlets of Niagara Falls is an outlet mall in Niagara Falls, New York.

== History ==
On July 19, 1982, the outlet mall opened in a former King's discount store.

An extensive 1995 expansion added 50 stores, including Saks Off 5th. On December 3, 1997, the mall was acquired by Prime Retail Inc. (now part of The Lightstone Group) for $89 million. A $12 million renovation in 2006 added new tenants and renamed the complex Fashion Outlets Niagara Falls USA. The mall became a Macerich property in 2011. A further 175,000 sq. ft. expansion opened on October 23, 2014 with a ribbon-cutting ceremony on November 6, 2014 with festivities and entertainment until November 9, 2014.

== See also ==
- Rainbow Centre Factory Outlet – former rival opened in 1982 and was closed due to competition from Fashion Outlets.
