= Paul L. Cordish =

American politician

Member of the Maryland House of Delegates from the 4th district
- In office 1935–1941

Personal details
- Born: 1909 Baltimore, Maryland
- Died: 2003 (aged 93–94) Baltimore, Maryland
- Party: Democratic
- Spouse: Sylvia Cohn Bloom
- Children: Joel A. Cordish; Michael Cordish; David S. Cordish; Howard Paul Bloom (stepchild); Susan F. Abramson (stepchild); Marilyn E. Bloom (stepchild)
- Relatives: Reed Cordish (grandson)
- Occupation: Lawyer

Paul L. Cordish (1909–2003) was an attorney and a member of the Maryland House of Delegates, he was also a businessman who worked for the Cordish Company and the founder of the Cordish Law Firm.

== Early life and education ==
Cordish was born in Baltimore in 1909, he was a 1926 graduate of the Park School of Baltimore and earned his undergraduate degree at Johns Hopkins University. He earned his law degree, with honors, from Yale Law School in 1932. His father, Louis Cordish, was a cigar manufacturer who founded the Cordish Company in 1910 and served as the first president of the Shaarei Tfiloh Synagogue.

== Career ==
After law school, in 1932, he founded the Cordish Law Firm and in 1933, he joined the Baltimore-based, family real estate business, the Cordish Company, founded by his father Louis Cordish in 1910. Cordish Law serves as the legal arm of Cordish Company. In 1934, Cordish was elected to the Maryland House of Delegates to represent the 4th legislative district in Baltimore City. He became the leader of what was then called the liberal bloc. From 1940 to 1941, he was the chairman of the House Committee on Intergovernmental Cooperation. He voted against the formidable lobby representing bar and saloon owners, and sought to strike out a requirement that witnesses and jurors profess belief in God. From 1963 to 1966, he served as president of the Hebrew Immigrant Aid Society. In this position, he was able to collect $3 million from the West German government for Nazi victims of the Holocaust in Baltimore.

== Personal life ==
He married Ethel Patz; they had three sons: Joel A. Cordish of Jerusalem; Michael Cordish of Rehovot, Israel; and David S. Cordish of Baltimore. Ethel died at the age of 38. In 1957, he married his second wife, Sylvia Cohn Bloom. He also has three stepchildren: Howard Paul Bloom of Lake Hill, N.Y.; Susan F. Abramson of Finksburg; and Marilyn E. Bloom of Pleasant Hill, California. His son Joel was beaten and paralyzed in an attack when he was a Ph.D. student at the University of Michigan. His sons, Joel and Michael, became Orthodox Jews and moved to Israel. Joel died in 2010.

He died on April 8, 2003, and was interred at Shaarei Tfiloh Congregation Cemetery.

== Past general election results ==
- 1938 Race for Maryland House of Delegates – 4th District

Voters to choose six:

Name	Votes	Outcome
Leon Abramson, Democratic	13,113	Won
Jerome Robinson, Democratic	13,005	Won
Bernard S. Melnicove, Democratic	12,979	Won
Leon A. Rubenstein, Democratic	12,902	Won
Albert L. Sklar, Democratic	12,727	Won
Paul L. Cordish, Democratic	12,671	Won
W. A. C. Hughes, Jr., Republican	11,817	Lost
Arthur E. Briscoe, Republican	11,750	Lost
Sarah Fernandis Diggs, Republican	11,664	Lost
William Isaac Gosnell, Republican	11,556	Lost
Fannie A. Coplan, Republican	11,296	Lost
Benjamin M. Haughey, Republican	10,609	Lost
Albert E. Blumberg, Independent	578	Lost
