= The Cordish Companies =

American real estate developer

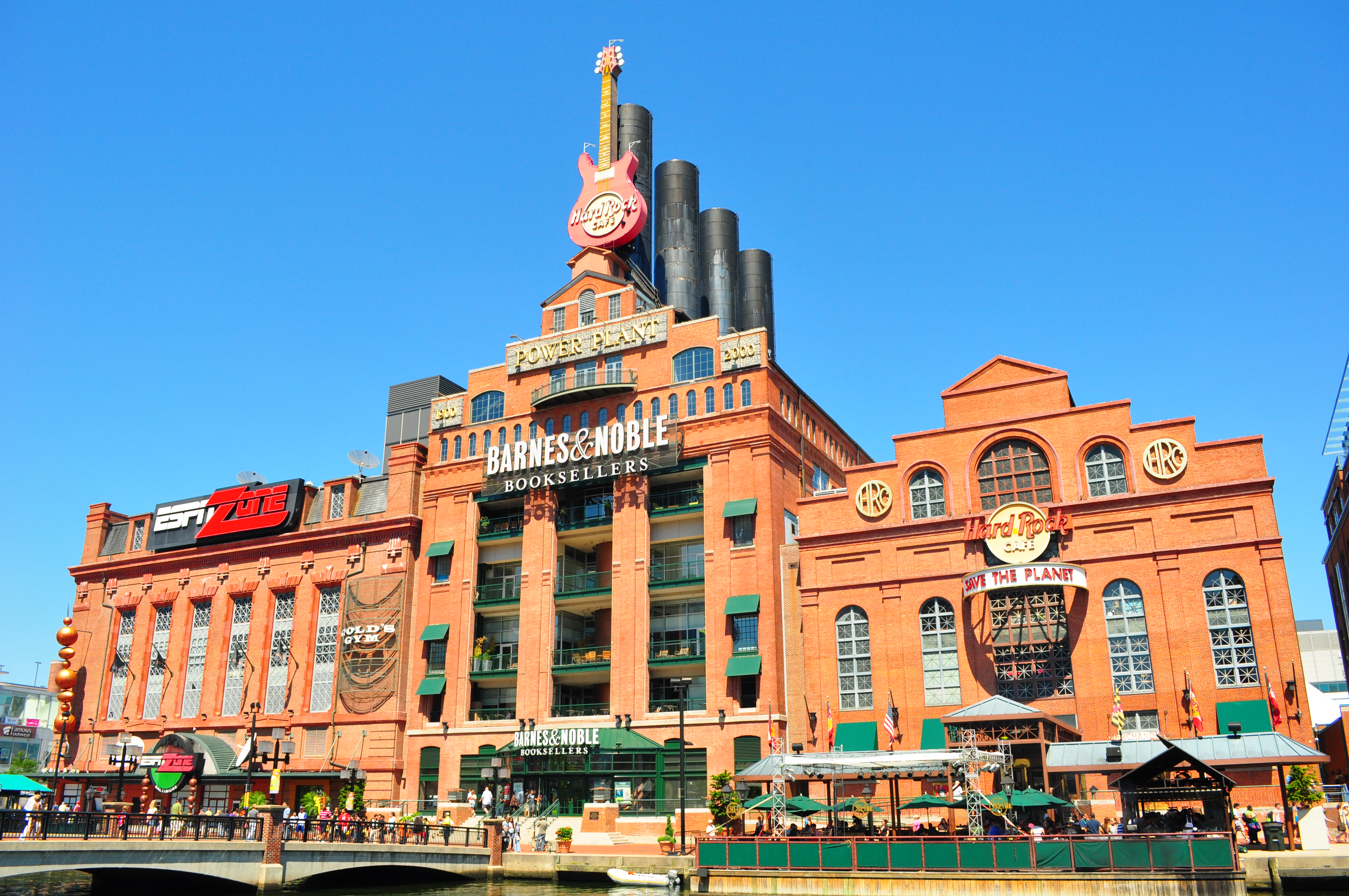
- The Pratt Street Power Plant houses the headquarters of The Cordish Companies on the sixth floor.
- Type: Privately held company
- Industry: Real estate development
- Founded: 1910; 116 years ago
- Founder: Louis Cordish
- Headquarters: Pratt Street Power Plant; Baltimore, Maryland; United States
- Key people: David Cordish, Chairman; CEO; Jon Cordish, Principal; Blake Cordish, Principal; Reed Cordish, Principal; Maggie Cordish, Cordish Family Foundation; Joe Weinberg, Principal
- Divisions: Live! Hospitality & Entertainment; Cordish Gaming Group; PlayLive!; Spark Coworking
- Website: www.cordish.com

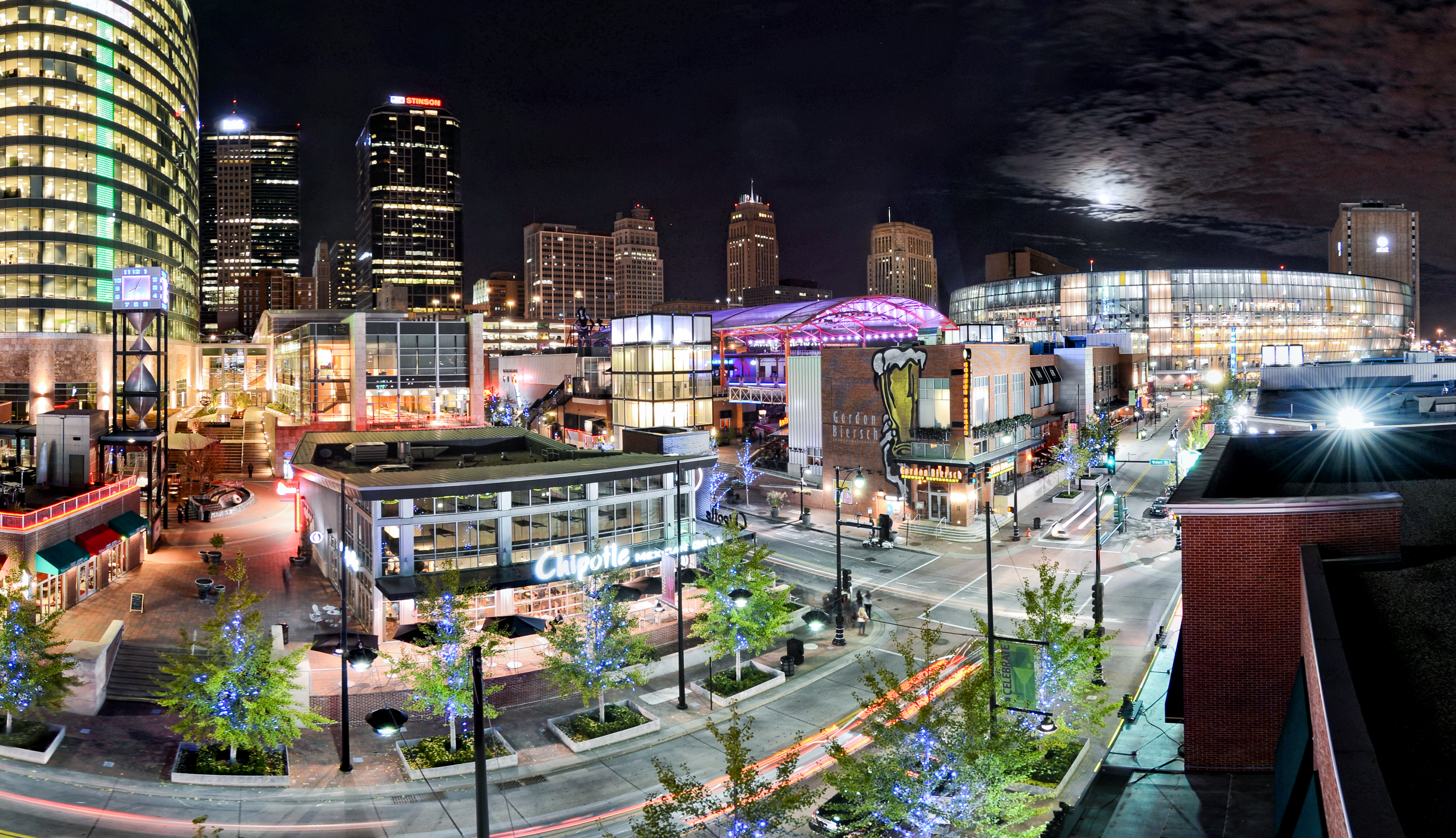
Kansas City Power & Light District in Kansas City, Missouri

The Cordish Companies is a U.S.-based real estate development and entertainment operating company with its headquarters on the 6th floor of the Pratt Street Power Plant in Baltimore, Maryland. It was founded in 1910 by Louis Cordish.

== History ==
Louis Cordish founded the company in 1910 and began developing real estate in the Baltimore–Washington metropolitan area.

In 1935, his son Paul L. Cordish joined the busines. In 1960, Paul's son, David S. Cordish, joined the firm and, 1968 assumed leadership.

In 1981, the gaming and hotel divisions were formed. Cordish opened the first Live! district, Power Plant Live! in 2001.

In 2004, the company developed the Seminole Hard Rock Hotel & Casino Tampa and the Seminole Hard Rock Hotel & Casino Hollywood.

In 2012, the company opened the first Cordish-owned casino, Live! Maryland.

In 2020, the company launched a brand new online gambling business called PlayLive!

The company registered NC Development Holdings in North Carolina in July 2023.

== Projects and investments ==
Notable properties developed, or under development, by the company are as follows:

- St. Louis Ballpark Village (St. Louis, MO)
- Bayou Place & Bayou Place Offices (Houston, TX)
- Charleston Place (Charleston, SC)
- Diamond Jacks Casino and Hotel (Bossier City), 2023
- Fourth Street Live! (Louisville, KY)
- Jacksonville Shipyards (Jacksonville, FL)
- Kansas City Live! (Kansas City, MO)
- Miami Live! (Miami, FL)
- Live! at the Battery (Atlanta, GA)
- Live! by Loews - Arlington, TX (Arlington, TX / St. Louis, MO)
- Live! Casino & Hotel Maryland at Arundel Mills (formerly Maryland Live! Casino) (Hanover, Anne Arundel County, Baltimore/Washington D.C.)
- Live! Casino & Hotel Philadelphia (Philadelphia, PA)
- Live! Casino Pittsburgh (Greensburg, PA)
- One Cardinal Way (St. Louis, MO)
- One Light Luxury Apartments (Kansas City, MO)
- Pattison Place (Philadelphia, PA)
- Kansas City Power & Light District (Kansas City, MO)
- Power Plant & Pier IV (Baltimore, MD)
- Power Plant Live! (Baltimore, MD)
- Seminole Hard Rock Hotel & Casino (Hollywood, FL / Tampa, FL)
  - Seminole Paradise (Hollywood, FL)
  - Hard Rock Live! (Hollywood, FL)
- Spark Baltimore (Baltimore, MD)
- Spark KC (Kansas City, MO)
- Stateside Live! (Philadelphia, PA)
- Texas Live! (Arlington, TX)
- Three Light Luxury Apartments (Kansas City, MO)
- Two Light Luxury Apartments (Kansas City, MO)
- Waterside District (formerly Waterside Live!/Waterside Festival Marketplace) - (Norfolk, VA) Cordish redeveloped the original Rouse Company/Enterprise Development Company-built pavilion into an entertainment district following decades of decline.
- Towson Square (Towson, MD) Jointly developed with Heritage Properties, Inc. As of February 2026, nearly all of its restaurants around the Cinemark theater have been vacant.
- Rainbow Centre Factory Outlet (Niagara Falls, NY) This mall has largely been abandoned since September 2000, though it was partially repurposed for SUNY Niagara.
- Live! Casino & Hotel Louisiana (Bossier City, LA) The company's latest Live! district developed. It had its grand opening on February 13, 2025.
- Live! Casino & Hotel Virginia (Petersburg, VA) Currently under construction with an expected full opening in late 2027, though the gaming facility had a temporary grand opening on January 23, 2026.

== Recognition ==
The Cordish Companies has been awarded seven ULI Awards for Excellence for positively impacting the cities in which they develop.
