= Phillips Foods, Inc. and Seafood Restaurants =

American seafood company

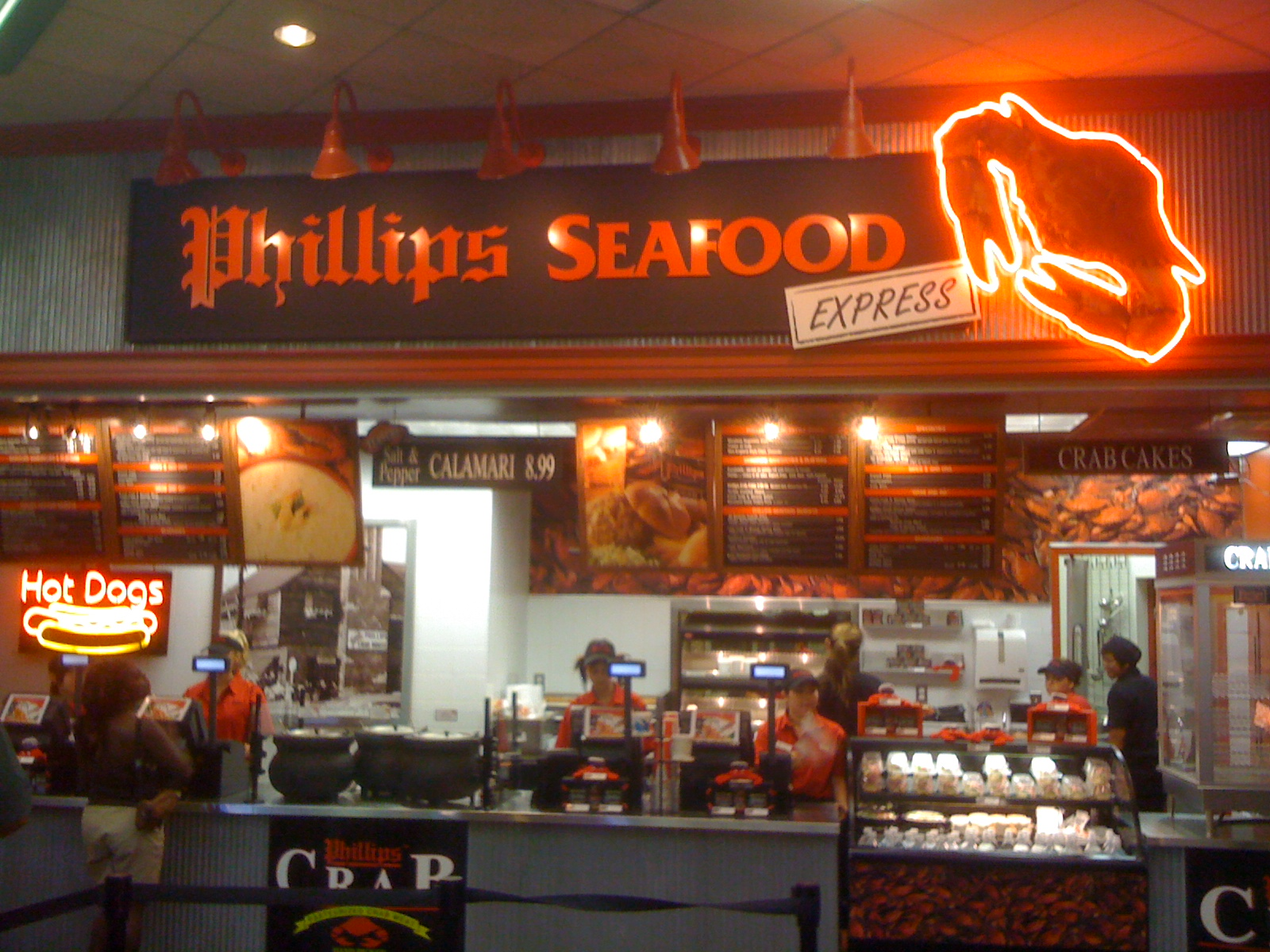
- Phillips Seafood Express at the Maryland House rest area
- Trade name: Phillips Seafood
- Type: Private
- Industry: Restaurant
- Genre: Seafood
- Founded: Hooper's Island (1916)
- Headquarters: Baltimore, Maryland, United States
- Key people: Dean Flowers (President), COO
- Products: Crab meat Crab cakes Seafood appetizers Gourmet soups
- Revenue: $200 million (2002)
- Number of employees: 1,200
- Website: phillipsseafood.com

Phillips Foods, Inc. and Seafood Restaurants, primarily doing business as Phillips Seafood, is a family owned and operated seafood company in the mid-Atlantic region, United States. Phillips Foods, Inc., seafood manufacturers as well as restaurateurs, specializes in crab meat and crab cakes, and produces a line of fish and shrimp products. The company is headquartered in Baltimore, Maryland. Phillips Seafood Restaurants have casual dining, buffet service and carryout.

== History ==
In 1914, Augustus E. Phillips established the company's first seafood processing plant on Hooper's Island in Maryland's Chesapeake Bay. The A.E. Phillips packing plant processed seafood from many of the watermen in the region. In 1956, after a surplus season of crabs, son Brice Phillips and wife Shirley opened the first "crab shack" in Ocean City, Maryland. Brice and Shirley began building a new dining room each year at Phillips Crab House until it finally seated 1400 people.

In 2002, the company was sued for violating the Lanham Act, a statute that provides consumer protection against false advertising. The plaintiff's claimed that Phillips was deceiving its customers after it said that it was following the original recipe while it used Asian crab meat instead of Maryland blue crab. The lawsuit was dismissed by the United States District Court for the District of Maryland, and the dismissal was affirmed by the Fourth Circuit.

Phillips Seafood Restaurants currently has 5 company-owned restaurants along the eastern coast of the United States, as well as a network of franchise locations in airports, travel plazas, casinos and sporting arenas.

In 2021, the Ocean City, Maryland restaurant located at 2004 Philadelphia Ave permentantely closed, with some sources saying it was due to the effects of the COVID-19 pandemic, while other sources said that new management wanted to shift towards national and international distribution, rather than operating restaurants.

== Crab manufacturing ==
Phillips is a leading global manufacturer of crab meat, and employs over 2,000 people worldwide. The company's crab processing facilities are found in the United States and Southeast Asia. Ten plants are located worldwide. In 1990, Phillips opened crab processing facilities in Southeast Asia to ensure a year-round supply of swimming crab meat for their restaurants. Phillips Foods has global sales offices in Baltimore, MD and Bangkok, Thailand. While most of the seafood production goes to the United States, the company has a growing market in Asia, Europe, and Australia.

== Products ==
Known primarily for their crab cakes, the company has an array of other products available to the retail and foodservice markets, such as crab meat, appetizers, fish, seafood cakes, soups, entrées, spices and sauces. Although the company's reputation was built on its origins as a producer of Maryland blue crab, it now markets primarily crab from Southeast Asia.

== See also ==
- List of seafood restaurants
