= Reed Cordish =

American real estate developer and government official (born 1974)

Reed S. Cordish
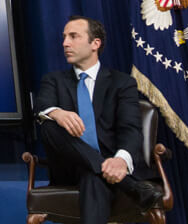
- Cordish in the Eisenhower Executive Office Building Auditorium

Assistant to the President
- In office January 20, 2017 – February 16, 2018
- Preceded by: Position established
- Succeeded by: Brooke Rollins

Personal details
- Born: June 18, 1974 (age 52) Baltimore, Maryland, U.S.
- Spouse: Maggie Cordish
- Children: 3
- Parent: David S. Cordish
- Education: Gilman School
- Alma mater: Princeton University
- Occupation: Former professional tennis player, real estate investor, public official

Reed Saunders Cordish (born June 18, 1974) is a fourth-generation American real estate developer, former professional tennis player, and former senior aide to President Donald Trump.

Cordish is a principal and partner at his family-owned Baltimore-based real estate investment and development firm The Cordish Companies where he was also affiliated with Live! Hospitality & Entertainment, a subsidiary of The Cordish Companies.

== Early life and education ==
Reed Saunders Cordish was born in 1974 in Baltimore, Maryland. He is the youngest son of former Goucher College professor Penelope (née Sales) and American real estate developer David S. Cordish. His grandfather is Paul L. Cordish. Both his parents were Jewish.

Cordish attended the Gilman School in Baltimore from first grade through high school. After graduating from Gilman, he went to Princeton University where he graduated with a bachelor's degree in English in 1996. Cordish was awarded the William Roper Award for the member of the senior class who demonstrates scholastic and athletic excellence.

While at Princeton, he played #1 singles on the Princeton tennis team for three years, earning a position on the All-Ivy Team and serving as captain of the team his senior year. He received the George Meyers Church Tennis Trophy for advancing tennis at Princeton in 1995 and 1996, and the Leon Lapidus Memorial Award awarded to the member of the men's tennis team with the greatest achievement and dedication.

== Career ==
=== Real estate development ===
Cordish was a principal and partner of The Cordish Companies, a real estate development and entertainment company. He also presided over Live! Hospitality & Entertainment, an entertainment and restaurant industry operations company under the umbrella of The Cordish Companies, sharing the same physical address.

At The Cordish Companies, Cordish helped develop the company's Live! brand, which has grown to encompass large-scale entertainment projects, sports-anchored districts, casinos, hotels and residential projects including Ballpark Village, the Power & Light District, Stateside Live!, and Maryland Live! Casino.

Live! Hospitality & Entertainment, provides hospitality and entertainment services, and operates multiple restaurants nationwide.

=== Tennis ===
Cordish played collegiate tennis at Princeton University. During his tenure at Princeton, he played #1 singles on the tennis team for multiple years, earning a position on the All-Ivy Team.

After college, Reed continued his tennis career for almost two years, qualifying to play on the Association of Tennis Professionals World Tour, and playing in the main draw of events including the ATP challenger in Brazil and the Legg Mason tour event in Washington D.C.

Cordish and his family were lead donors in building the Cordish Family Pavilion at the Lenz Tennis Center at Princeton University.

=== Politics ===
Cordish directed the Agency Beachhead teams for President-Elect Donald Trump during the 2016 presidential transition.

In January 2017, Cordish was appointed Assistant to the President for Intergovernmental and Technology Initiatives. Cordish was part of the Office of American Innovation, led by Trump Senior Adviser Jared Kushner, with a directive to overhaul government functions using ideas from the business sector. Other members of the Office of American Innovation included National Economic Council Director Gary Cohn, Assistant to the President and Senior Counselor for Economic Initiatives Dina Powell, and Assistant to the President and Director of Strategic Initiatives Chris Liddell. Mr. Cordish played a principal role in domestic policy initiatives including Workforce Development and Criminal Justice Reform.

Cordish resigned in February 2018, saying that he never planned to stay with the administration for more than a year and that his policy role was complete.

== Personal life ==
In 2010, he married Margaret "Maggie" Katz in a ceremony at his home in Baltimore. He and his wife are close friends and neighbors of Jared Kushner and Ivanka Trump. Ivanka introduced the couple who would later work in the White House under the Kushners. Maggie Cordish is a student at Johns Hopkins University.

Cordish is chairman of the board of trustees for Johns Hopkins Hospital. In 2012, the university opened and dedicated the Cordish Lacrosse Center. He is on the board of trustees for the National Medal of Honor Museum.
