= David S. Cordish =

American real estate developer

- Born: January 30, 1940 (age 86); Baltimore, Maryland
- Citizenship: United States
- Education: B.A. Johns Hopkins University; J.D. University of Maryland Law School; M.L.A. Johns Hopkins University
- Occupation: businessman
- Known for: CEO and Chairman of Cordish Company
- Spouse(s): Penny Arden Sales (divorced); Suzi Keats
- Children: with Sales: --Jonathan Cordish --Blake Cordish --Reed Cordish
- Parent(s): Ethel Patz Cordish; Paul L. Cordish

David S. Cordish (born January 30, 1940) is an American real estate developer, son of Paul L. Cordish, and the third generation CEO and Chairman of the Cordish Companies.

== Biography ==
David S. Cordish was born in Baltimore, the son of Ethel (née Patz) and Paul L. Cordish. His father founded the Cordish Law Firm which served as and continues to serve as the legal arm of the Cordish Company which was founded by his grandfather, Louis Cordish in 1910. His father also was elected to the Maryland House of Delegates in 1934 to represent the 4th legislative district in Baltimore City.

In 1956, he graduated from Baltimore City College at the age of 16. In 1960, he earned a B.A. from Johns Hopkins University; in 1963, he earned a J.D. from the University of Maryland Law School where he was on the Board of Editors of the Law Review; and in 1965, he earned a M.L.A. from Johns Hopkins University. In 1968, he joined The Cordish Company (currently The Cordish Companies) and began developing regional, community and neighborhood shopping centers and office buildings. with intermediate stints as chair of the Baltimore City Housing Authority (1972–1974) where he helped mediate city labor disputes; and as Director of Urban Development Action Grant program in Washington D.C. at the Department of Housing and Urban Development (UDAG) in both the Carter and Reagan Administrations.

In 1981, after having interrupted a successful development career to serve as Director of UDAG, he began a second division of the company that specializes in the development and redevelopment of multi-use downtown urban projects. In addition to his service at HUD, Cordish has been appointed to a variety of civic leadership positions as well as serving on numerous national, state, and local boards both professionally and charitably. He has chaired the Baltimore City Housing Authority, the Baltimore City Harbor Endowment Foundation, and several public policy task forces appointed at various times by the Mayors of Baltimore. Cordish served as a pro bono consultant and mediator for Johns Hopkins University, Loyola College (currently Loyola University Maryland), Stevenson University, and other non-profit entities in dealing with major development projects and relationships with the neighborhoods around them. Cordish was the recipient of the 2004 Johns Hopkins Real Estate Program's Leadership Award, and numerous other regional and national honors and awards.

As of 2010, The Cordish Companies has grown to over $1 billion in sales under his stewardship.

== Personal life ==
He has two brothers: Joel A. Cordish of Jerusalem and Michael Cordish of Rehovot, Israel; and three stepsiblings: Howard Paul Bloom of Lake Hill, N.Y.; Susan F. Abramson of Finksburg; and Marilyn E. Bloom of Pleasant Hill, California. His brother Joel was paralyzed by a gunshot wound during an attempted robbery, while pursuing his doctorate in Michigan. In 1964, he married his college sweetheart, Penny Arden Sales (born 1940) who was also Jewish. They had three sons: Jonathan Cordish, Blake Cordish, and Reed Cordish. As of 2014, all three of his sons serve with The Cordish Companies: Jonathan (Vice President of Private Equity Holdings), Blake (Vice President of Real Estate Development), and Reed (Vice President of Entertainment Management). The couple divorced in 1987. Penny is a professor at Goucher College. He is remarried to Suzi (née Keats) Cordish (born 1956).
