= Southern High School (Baltimore, Maryland) =

Defunct high school in Maryland, United States

Coordinates: 39.276828°N 76.607329°W

Southern High School was a former public secondary school on Warren Avenue between William Street to the west and Riverside Avenue to the east, in the Federal Hill neighborhood of the northern side of the larger old South Baltimore community on the Whetstone Point peninsula. With historic Fort McHenry (former Fort Whetstone dating from the American Revolutionary War) from the War of 1812 (1812-1815), to the southeast at the point itself and additional residential areas surrounding the high school in tightly packed rowhouses and streets known as Locust Point and Riverside to the south and southeast along with the restored Otterbein and Sharp-Leadenhall neighborhoods to the west, also just south of the downtown central business district and famed "Inner Harbor" of the City of Baltimore, in Maryland.

The old Southern High complex of buildings faces historic Federal Hill Park across the street to the north, overlooking the current tourist attractions of the Inner Harbor of the former industrial/commercial "Basin" of the Northwest Branch of the Patapsco River dating as a port since 1706, as Baltimore Harbor.

S.H.S. was originally built in 1910 as one of the first of a new national type of school becoming popular in American public education by the 1920s organizing grades seven, eight and nine together, then known as the "junior high school" (later reorganized, advanced earlier by a grade and known as "middle schools" for the 6th-7th-8th grades by the 1980s) and had a co-ed student body with both boys and girls for the first time in Baltimore City, which previously only had four specialized/college preparatory/citywide, sex-segregated (single sex) public high schools - with all-male: Baltimore City College (1839), Baltimore Polytechnic Institute (1883), and the all-female: Western High School (1844), Eastern High School (1844), since the beginnings of the Baltimore City Public Schools system in 1829. Also a public high school had also been established in 1883 "The Colored High School", which later became Frederick Douglass High School which at some point in its history became open to both African-American boys and girls. In addition, with also co-educational Forest Park High School later built in the early 1920s in the northwest area of the city as the first "co-ed" Baltimore public high school, these types of neighborhood/district "comprehensive" public high schools soon spread through all quadrants of the city, eventually numbering about 20 co-ed neighborhood high schools in the Baltimore City Public Schools by the early 1970s. In the surrounding rural now suburban Baltimore County to the west, north and east of the city and Anne Arundel County to the city's south, the first public high school established in the late 19th century were open to both boys and girls and eventually grew to a similar number of about 25 secondary schools in neighborhoods each in both counties to the present.

An addition/annex building to the east of the original 1910 S.H.S. structure, also facing Warren Avenue at the intersection with Riverside Avenue was constructed in 1926 of matching red brick with limestone trim and a more modernist style gym-swimming pool brick building to the south in 1956.

The new type of co-educational neighborhood public high school had a challenging new role in the Baltimore City Public Schools system. Now raised to the level of a full high school / secondary school from its previous lower "junior high" status, the building was assigned the BCPS number of #70 in the 1920s.

The Southern High School, originally located on the southeast corner of Warren Avenue and William Street, three blocks to the east from the main commercial district of the old South Baltimore commercial district neighborhood between Light Street and South Charles Street, with the adjacent municipal markethouse (one of originally eleven at their height, later seven of the city Public Market House system) of the Cross Street Market, established in the 1840s.

The Southern High building was constructed of red brick with limestone trim in a Jacobean/English Tudor style architecture used for a number of Baltimore City and other American schools of that era. Located on a 2.45-acre (9,900 m^{2}) site adjacent to the sidewalks with rows of traditional Baltimore rowhouses with famous white marble steps and front facade bases were on the east, west and south sides of the school in the Federal Hill/South Baltimore neighborhood, but fronting towards the southern side of Federal Hill Park which overlooks the downtown skyline of the city's central business district and the former "Basin", now the famed "Inner Harbor".

The Southern High building complex at its most extensive period contained an auditorium, three gymnasiums, a 500-person capacity cafeteria, library, six shops, six home education rooms, one laboratory, and 44 classrooms.

By 1955, the school had an enrollment of 1,800 students, necessitating further enlargement of the facilities. Then Mayor Thomas J. D'Alesandro, Jr., broke ground on an expansion project designed to accommodate 600 additional students. This $2 million (1956 money) addition and expansion was completed in the summer of 1956, which added eight more regular classrooms, a double classroom, five new art rooms, eight commercial classrooms for typing and business machines, three music rooms, a three shops for machine, print and auto mechanic instruction, allowing the school to thrive while the city continued to grow.

== Construction of replacement building, 1976–1978 ==
By 1976, when the school had again outgrown its capacity, but also with declining physical conditions because of decades of suffering heavy hard usage with typical big city annual budget problems of poor and often deferred maintenance, Baltimore City Public School officials deemed it necessary to erect a new structure. The "new" Southern High School, was only two blocks to the southeast in the 1100 block of Covington Street, overlooking to the north and east of the Northwest Branch of the Patapsco River, east of the Inner Harbor towards the lower Baltimore Harbor which was still active and busy with freight, cargo and shipping facilities. The new S.H.S. looked down a two block slope towards the Francis Scott Key Highway of 1913 ("Key Highway") and the shipyards from the Bethlehem Steel Corporation from Bethlehem, Pennsylvania bordering it on the north side waterfront facing the Patapsco River's Northwest Branch. Upon its completion in late 1978, the new modernist simple stark block building of light tan/brown brick was capable of accommodating 2,400 students. The State of Maryland's School Construction Program provided $11.7 million for the project of the estimated total cost of $17 million.

== Transition to Digital Harbor High School, 2002–2005 ==
The Covington Street structure still remains but the high school changed names and academic focus in 2002, being renamed and becoming the current Digital Harbor High School. The last class of Southern High School graduated in 2005.

== Notable alumni ==
The original Southern High School building was renovated and reopened in September, 1983 as a condominium and apartment complex. One of its most famous alumni, Hall of Fame baseball player Al Kaline, graduated from Southern High School in 1953 and began playing that summer as an 18-year-old in the Major Leagues for the Detroit Tigers. Other notable alumni include professional wrestler Brian "Axl Rotten" Knighton.
