= Robert Lewis Baker =

American horticulturalist (1937–1979)

Robert Lewis Baker (1937 – October 31, 1979) was an American horticulturist and botanist at the University of Maryland, a professor at University of Maryland and widely known as a leader in the campaign to keep federal interstates and expressways from cutting through Baltimore's historic neighborhoods. Baker lectured and published and was active in preserving the Federal Hill district of Baltimore, in turn helping to preserve the neighborhoods of Otterbein, Fell's Point and Highlandtown.

Baker's own garden in Federal Hill was regularly featured in the Baltimore Sun and, after he died, it was recreated at the Baltimore Flower and Garden Show. He was commemorated by the Baker Garden at the United States National Arboretum and by Robert Baker Park – the latter, a pocket park on the northern perimeter of Federal Hill neighborhood of Baltimore, very near the foot of Federal Hill Park.

== Biography ==
Robert (Bob) Lewis Baker was born 24 March, 1937 in Baltimore to Marian Baker (nee Lewis, 1907–1990) and Albert Edmond Baker (1900–1995), the latter having been an active member of the Mount Royal Improvement Association.

Red-haired, Baker grew up in Baltimore's Bolton Hill area. Having graduated from Baltimore City College and Swarthmore College, Baker received his MS and Ph.D. degrees from the University of Maryland. He ultimately became a widely recognized assistant professor of Horticulture and associate professor of botany with the University of Maryland, and an internationally recognized plantsman.

Considered an expert on urban gardens, Baker published numerous horticultural articles; the book Pruning Ornamental Trees & Shrubs; and the small booklet, A Small City Garden: A Beginners Guide, In addition he traveling to Europe and Asia, including Japan in 1974 to study Japanese gardening principles, he lectured widely in the Baltimore area, on topics ranging from Federal Hill architecture – to plant selection for year-round interest.

Letter to the Editor, Baltimore Sun, October 9, 1969

Sir,

I recently returned from Seattle where I noted the massive interstate freeways which cut through that city in several directions. However, I learned that in spite of the scale and extent of these roads rush-hour traffic volume has surpassed the freeway's capacity and that total stoppage of traffic is a frequent occurrence.

The Washington State Highways Director, G. H. Andrews, has had to restrict access to the freeway in certain areas, since the roadway intended to serve long-distance travelers first and local commuters second. Mr. Andrews has also spoken in favor of mass transit, saying he believes in "some solution other than more and more highways" in the Seattle area.

Baltimore is on the verge of falling into the same predicament. How grimly ironic if we allow Mayor D'Alesandro and the "road gang' to sacrifice the unique Fells Point area to an expressway only to dis-cover that when completed, it is unable to perform the functions its supporters had claimed for it.

Robert Lewis Baker

Baker was a prominent leader in the campaign to keep interstates and expressways from cutting through Baltimore's historic neighborhoods and was active in the Federal Hill Neighborhood Association, board member of the Baltimore Heritage Society, officer of the Federal Hill and Fells Point Fund, member of the Montgomery Urban Renewal District, and board member and former secretary and president of the Society for the Preservation of Federal Hill and Fells Point. In addition to organizing walking tours of the Federal Hill area, maintaining a photographic record documenting changes in South Baltimore, Baker was a member of the American Society of Plant Taxonomists; the International Plant Propagators Society; and was a founding member (1969) of the Horticultural Society of Maryland. Baker was a founding member of the Washington Horticulture Society, and consulted with the Smithsonian Institution.

He grew up at 1607 Park Avenue, in the Bolton Hill neighborhood, later lived in College Park – and lived from 1968 to 1979 at 407 Warren Avenue, directly at the top of Federal Hill Park.

Baker was one of the first to restore a residence in Federal Hill, what had become an unpopular and decaying section of Baltimore and when, by 1971, many of the houses were scheduled for demolition. He transformed his townhouse's 15' x 15' concrete-slabbed courtyard into "part botanic garden, part research lab and part display garden" – later overtaking area from his neighbors property, expanding the garden, using bonsai dwarfing, cloud pruning (Niwaki) and miniature gardening techniques – and filling it with plants ranging from 150 carefully scaled varieties of perennials, to climbing moonflower vines with honeysuckle specimens he'd collected on road trips to Maryland's Eastern Shore. His garden was regularly featured in the Baltimore Sun.

Baker died on October 31, 1979, at Johns Hopkins Hospital after a two-year turn with hepatitis, at age 42. Ten days before his death, Baker and his townhouse micro-garden were featured in a cover article for the Baltimore Sun's Gardening section. In 1980, the year following his death, David H. Tag, with the Horticultural Society of Maryland honored Baker by recreating part of his Federal Hill garden at the Baltimore Flower and Garden Show (1978-1982).

Robert Baker was commemorated with a garden in his name, The Baker Garden, at the United States National Arboretum in Washington DC, where he had worked, studied and had lectured at its Landscape Design Study Programs for 11 years. For a number of years, The Horticultural Society of Maryland sponsored the Baker Memorial Lecture to raise money for a Baker Scholarship – for Maryland students of horticulture and landscape design. A gardening lecture series was named after him at Bryn Mawr College, which also offered an annual scholarship in his name.
