= Otterbein, Baltimore =

Coordinates: 39°16.9′N 76°37′W

Otterbein
- Neighborhood of Baltimore
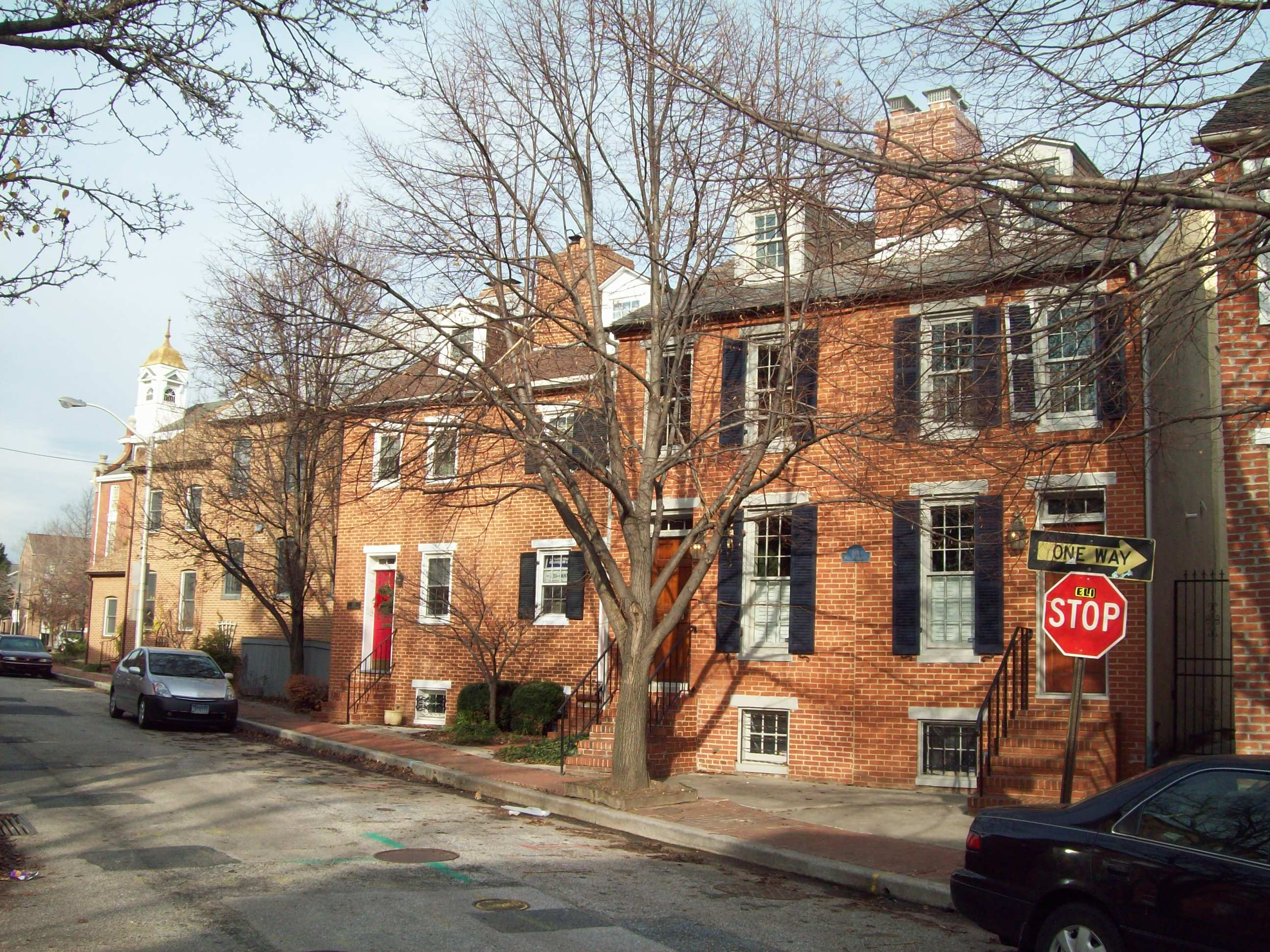
- The Little Montgomery Street Historic District within Otterbein

- Location within Baltimore
- Country: United States
- State: Maryland
- City: Baltimore
- Time zone: UTC-5 (Eastern)
  - Summer (DST): EDT
- ZIP Code: 21230
- Area code: 410, 443, and 667

Otterbein is a neighborhood of historic rowhouses in Baltimore, Maryland, United States, located immediately southwest of, and in close walking distance to the city's Inner Harbor.

Originally dating the 1700s, Otterbein is widely known as one of the oldest and most successful instances of urban homesteading, serving as a reminder of the significant, concerted and successful effort in the early 1970s to mediate between a concerted local advocacy and activism on behalf of the community and its neighbors — and Federal transportation initiatives which proposed fourteen lanes of traffic through historic Otterbein, Federal Hill, Highlandtown and Fell's Point — as well as a tunnel underneath the city's nearby, prominent and historic Federal Hill Park.

Otterbein is bounded by Hanover Street to the East, Sharp Street to the West, Barre Street to North and Henrietta Street to the South — though many contemporary delineations encompass immediately adjacent streets. The neighborhood, which includes small parts of zip codes 21201 and 21230, is named after Old Otterbein Church, located immediately to the north.

Otterbein is served two community associations: The Otterbein Community Association, representing the older historic homes, and the Harbor Walk Townhouse Association representing properties to the east, constructed after the period of urban homesteading. Both entities share the website theotterbein.org.

== History ==
The original houses in the neighborhood were constructed in the 1840s and 1850s as single houses or as two-house "developments." The size of the houses, and the social status of their occupants, varied primarily based on their location within a square-block pattern. The largest homes and most affluent residents were located on the primary east-west streets (Barre, Lee, and Hill). These homes were built and lived in by a mixture of business people involved in leadership positions in some of the most important industries of the city, including construction (especially brick-making), shipping, shipbuilding, the Baltimore and Ohio Railroad, and retail sales.

Houses on the primary north-south streets (Sharp and Hanover) were smaller but still sizable for the time period. Residents in these homes were involved in many of the same industries as their wealthier neighbors, but usually in less-remunerative skilled or clerk positions. The smallest homes in the neighborhood were built on half-sized lots along the east-west and even north-south "alleys" on the interior of blocks formed by the primary streets (Welcome Alley, York Street, Comb Alley, Peach Alley). These homes were largely occupied by unskilled manual laborers or low-skill craftspeople, including cordwainers (cobblers), draymen, carters, factory workers, and construction laborers. In addition to the mix of social class and house size within a particular block, house size and social class also went slightly from higher to lower along a northeast to southwest gradient (richest people and largest homes to the north and east, diminishing in the southern and western parts of the neighborhood). In addition to this diversity in housing size, employment, and social class, the neighborhood was also a diverse mix of "native" whites, white immigrants from other states, established and prosperous German and Irish immigrants, newer and poorer German and Irish immigrants, and free blacks.

Otterbein experienced a new wave of immigration in the late nineteenth and early-twentieth centuries by immigrants from Italy, Greece, Russia, and Poland. A Catholic church on Lee St. and an affiliated school on Hill St. helped serve many of these immigrants. The housing stock and overall affluence of the neighborhood declined throughout this period as wealthier families moved into larger homes in newly established neighborhoods farther away from downtown Baltimore.

The final stage in this decline began during World War II, as a need for war housing led the owners of Otterbein homes to split up the individual rowhouses into many apartments, leading to overcrowding, poor sanitation, architectural sloppiness, and deteriorating physical conditions. After the war ended, few workers remained in this inner-city slum but rather moved to the suburbs, while property owners did not reinvest nor reverse the earlier shift to apartments. Alley homes and backyard shacks especially deteriorated, while the factories, shipping, and shipbuilding industries which had supplied most of the area jobs largely left the area, leaving the Inner Harbor a desolate expanse of rotting piers, empty warehouses, and sunken ships.

== 1970s and Urban Homesteading ==
The neighborhood was seized by the government during the early 1970s and emptied of its residents, churches, and other institutions in preparation for the construction of Interstate 95 and Interstate 70 through downtown Baltimore — at that time delineated to cut through and destroy not only Otterbein, but also Federal Hill, Highlandtown and Fell's Point. While Otterbein was successfully taken by the government, residents of Federal Hill and Fell's Point organized a very powerful grassroots coalition that succeeded in re-routing the interstate to a more southern route, in turn saving the three neighborhoods.

Between 1966 and 1971, city officals added a swath of land comprising much of the present-day Otterbein neighborhood ("Inner Harbor West") into the Inner Harbor redevelopment area. In 1971, the city secured $19 million in HUD funds to develop a "model residential community" on the site, and selected the Shelter Corporation as master developer. Inner Harbor West was modeled on the "New Town-In Town" concept, similarly to Cedar Square West in Minneapolis, MN (also developed by the Shelter Corporation). The complex was to include approximately 2,000 residential units across high-rise towers, walk-ups, and townhomes, as well as a middle school and other neighborhood services. In 1972, Kenzo Tange was selected as lead architect for a project, and much of Otterbein was cleared for redevelopment. In 1973, due to Nixon's federal funding moratorium for HUD projects, the project's scope was downsized. By 1976, the plans were entirely scrapped.

The anti-highway effort was led in part by Highlandtown resident Barbara Mikulski, who used her success and prominence in this fight to launch her political career. Another notable participant in the grassroots coalition was Robert Lewis Baker, who is memorialized by Robert Baker Park, located roughly adjacent to Federal Hill Park.

The changed path of Interstate 95 left the government in possession of hundreds of badly-deteriorated rowhouses in Otterbein. After starting to tear them down, the City of Baltimore decided to keep the remaining houses intact and inaugurate the largest urban homesteading program in the history of the United States. All of the existing original neighborhood houses were restored in the 1970s as a part of Baltimore's "dollar homes" urban homesteading program. After the success of this homesteading project in Otterbein was assured, the city allowed for the development of new townhomes and condominiums around the existing core of historic homes.
