= McKeldin Square =

Coordinates: 39°17′10″N 76°36′47″W

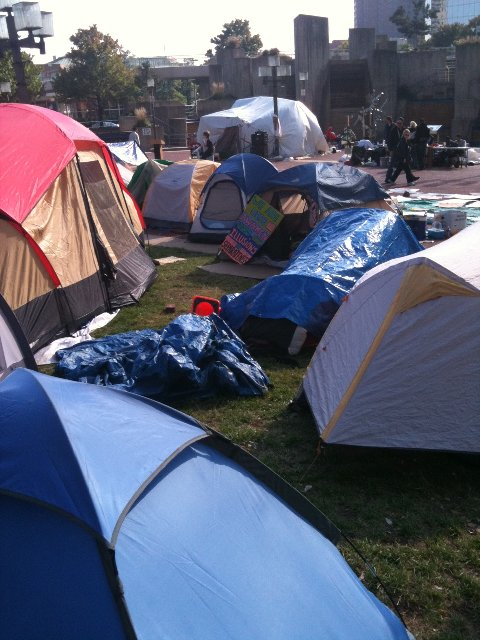
Occupy Baltimore protesters at McKeldin Square

McKeldin Square is an area of Downtown Baltimore, located near the Inner Harbor at the corners of Pratt and Light Streets.

The central area is a polygon of brick. On the Pratt St. side there is a strip of grass; behind the brick there used to be a pool at the base of a multi-leveled concrete structure with walkways and fountains; however, this fountain structure was removed in 2016 as part of the Inner Harbor 2.0 plan and maintenance costs, as well as hygiene and sanitary concerns.

The location of the square puts it right in the middle of Baltimore's 1861 riots, during which locals turned on a Union regiment that was passing through the city.

McKeldin Square has been designated as Baltimore's zone for protests, where it is legal to exercise one's First Amendment rights and pass out pamphlets. Permits are required for groups with groups of 25 or more requiring a permit. On October 4, 2011, it became the location of the Occupy Baltimore protests until their December 13 eviction.
