= Maryland Science Center =

Coordinates: 39°16′53″N 76°36′43″W

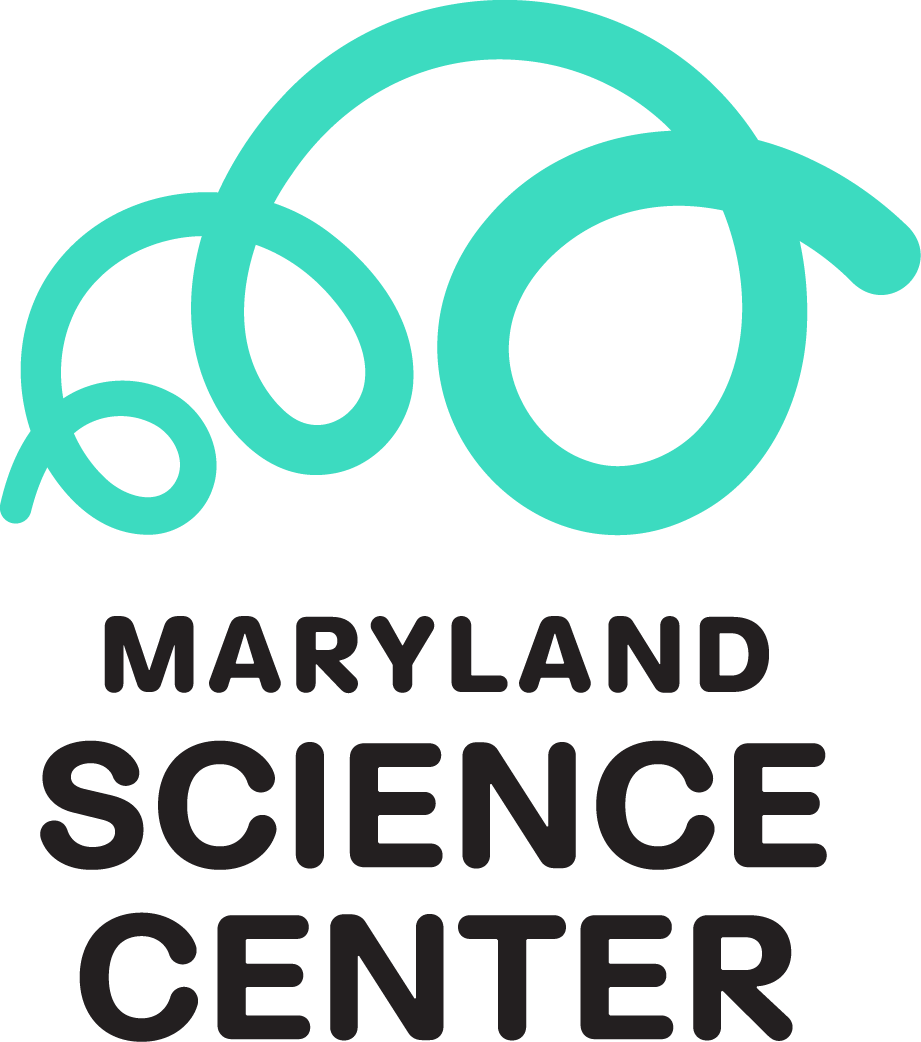

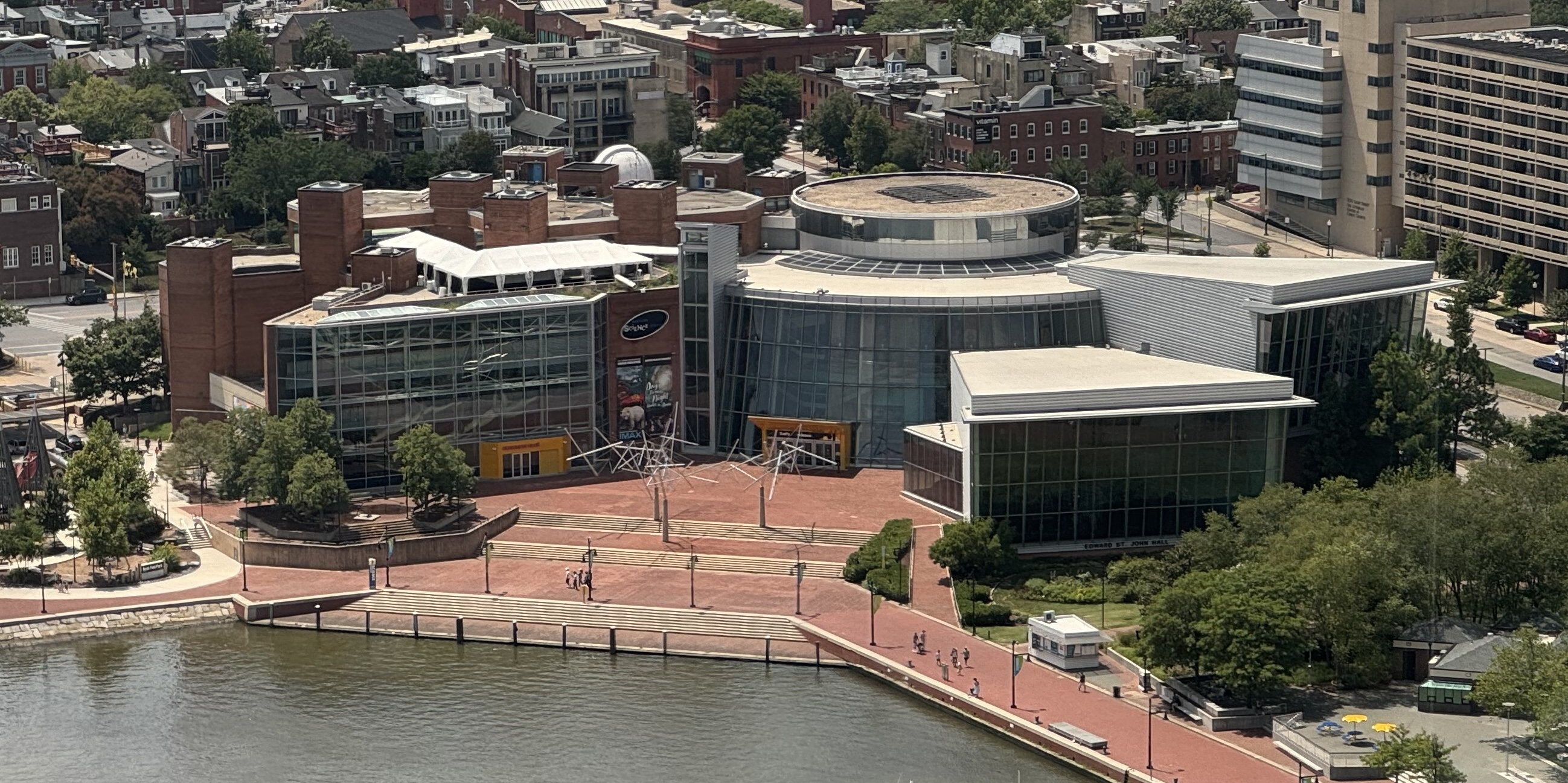
- Established: June 1976; 50 years ago
- Location: Baltimore, Maryland, U.S.
- Type: Science museum
- Public transit access: Camden Station
- Website: www.mdsci.org

The Maryland Science Center (MSC), located in Baltimore's Inner Harbor, opened to the public in 1976. It includes three levels of exhibits, a planetarium, and an observatory. It was one of the original structures that drove the revitalization of the Baltimore Inner Harbor from its industrial roots to a thriving downtown destination. In 1987, an IMAX theater was added, but the museum continued to show its age as the end of the 20th century approached. In May 2004, a large addition to the property was opened, and the modernized hands-on exhibits now include more than two dozen dinosaur skeletons. Subjects that the center displays include physical science, space, and the human body.

At its location south of the city's central business district on the city's Inner Harbor, the facility is located off the Key Highway near the foot of its historic Federal Hill Park and the nearby Robert Baker Park.

Maryland Science Center won a 2006 Best of Baltimore award for "Best Place to Take Kids." In 2008, the Maryland Science Center was named one of the “10-Best Science Centers for Families” by Parents magazine.

== Exhibits ==
Dinosaur Mysteries
This exhibit includes full scale, full body models of two dinosaurs — Astrodon (Maryland's state dinosaur) and Acrocanthosaurus — and full scale replica skeletons of Giganotosaurus, Albertosaurus, Tyrannosaurus, Herrerasaurus, Tarbosaurus, and Compsognathus. It also includes a section where guests can go on a mock paleontological dig to uncover an Iguanodon skeleton.
Newton's Alley
This exhibit features hands-on physical science related demonstrations including a "Bernoulli blower," "inertia table," and other similar things.
St. John Properties IMAX Theater
This IMAX theater hosts a five story tall screen complete with surround sound, digital projection, and true stadium seating. Tickets can be added on to regular admission for $5.00.
Science & Main
Visitors can solve challenges and explore physics such as flying a paper airplane and building with large blocks.
Make
A do-it-yourself workshop where visitors can create inventive objects. Activities rotate weekly.
Science Aglow
This exhibit allows guests to experiment with the optics and physics of light.
You – The Inside Story
This exhibit shows guests what senses the inside of the human body is used. It includes a bed of nails which guests can try out.
SciLab
A laboratory for 8 to 9-year-old children, where they can conduct science experiments.
Space
This exhibit examines the enormity of our universe through the lens of scientific discovery. It includes an infinity room, a spaghettification simulator, and more.
Harvey M. Meyerhoff Digital Planetarium
The planetarium features both live and recorded shows that last between 30 and 40 minutes each. The planetarium seats up to 140 guests and is included with regular admission.
Power Up
This exhibit shows guests how electric energy is used in everyday lives.
Math in Nature
This exhibit features interactive activities that shows how nature relies on math.
The Kids Room
A room for children 8 and younger and their families, which includes a water table, a mock ship, and other activities for young children.
Design Build Test
This exhibit is a space for early learners to explore creativity and work through the engineering process.
The Demo Stage
The Demo stage features live science demonstrations including ones about combustion chemistry, liquid nitrogen, optical illusions, and static electricity.

== Gallery ==
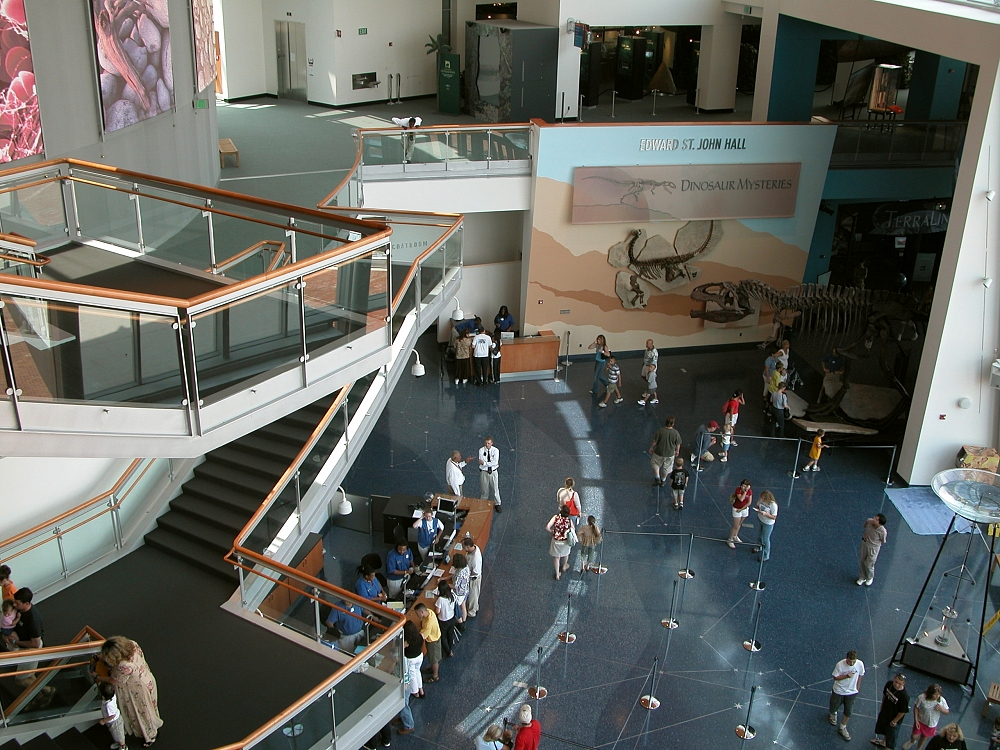
Lobby

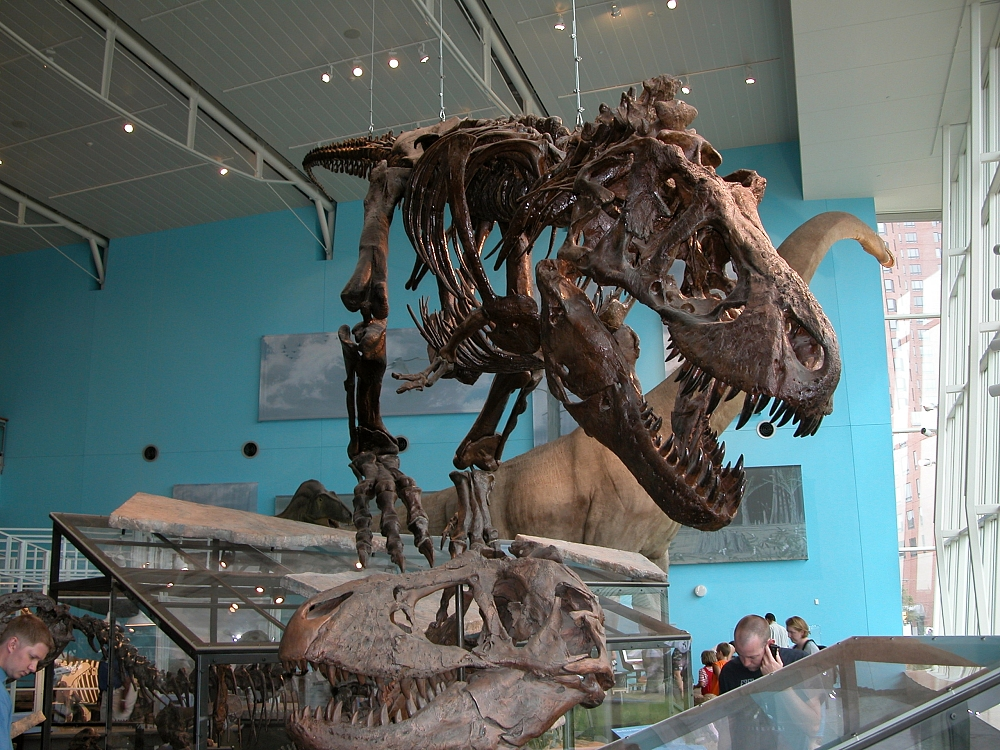
T. rex in Dinosaur Mysteries

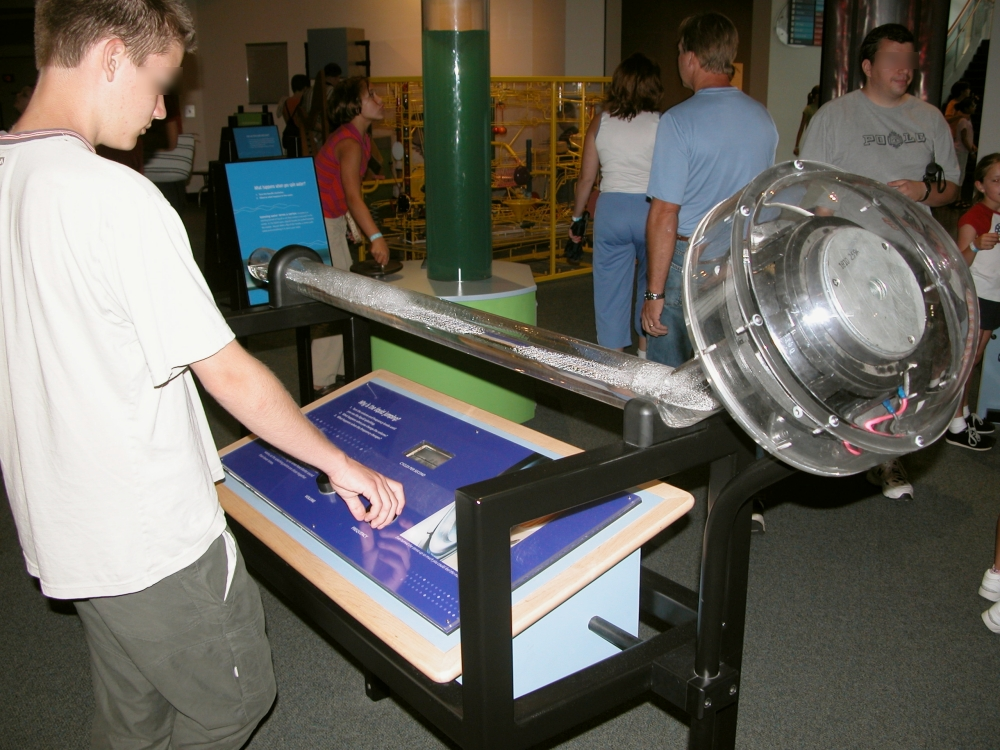
Exploring sound waves in Newton's Alley

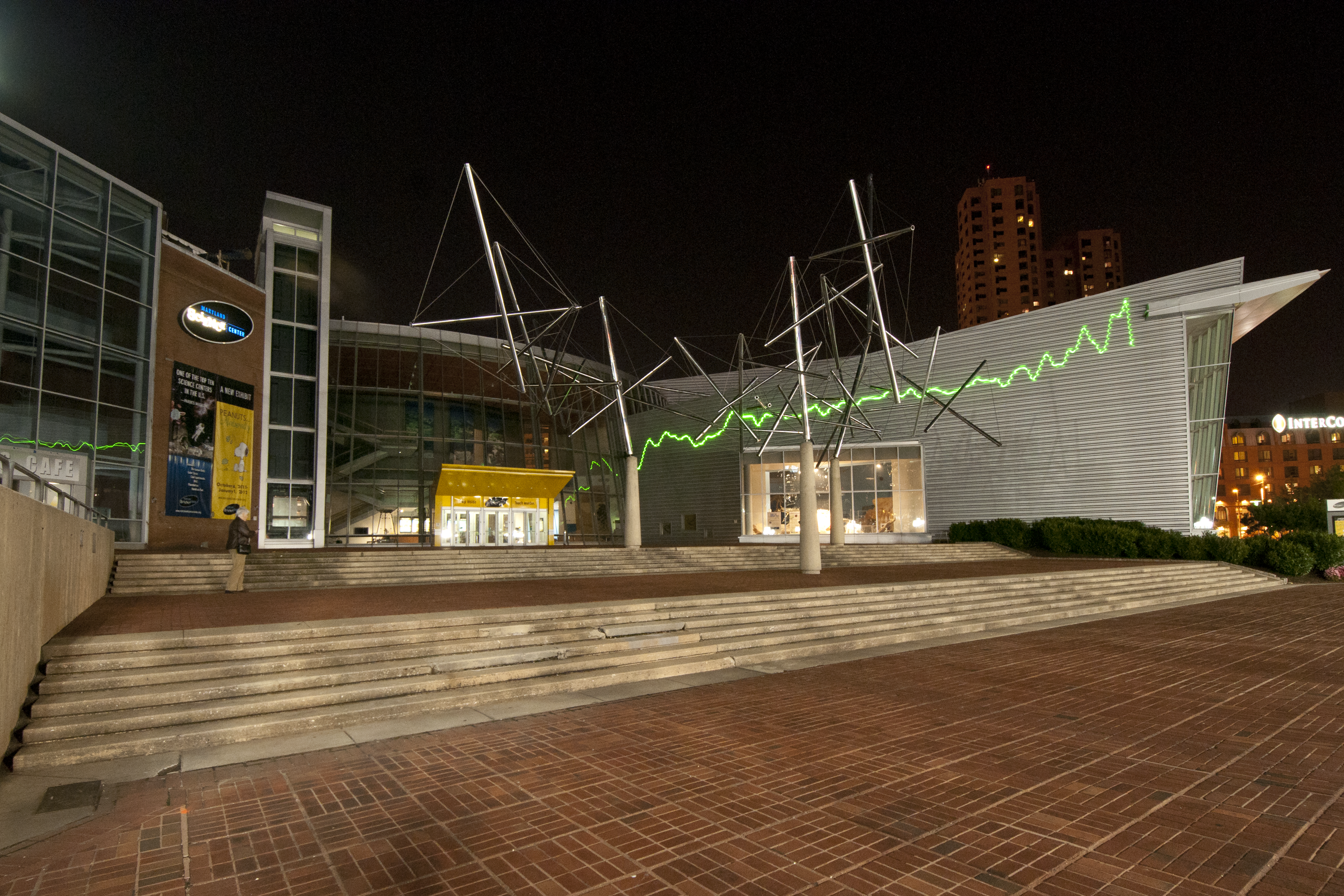
Hubble Space Telescope Spectra displayed on the Maryland Science Center in September 2011

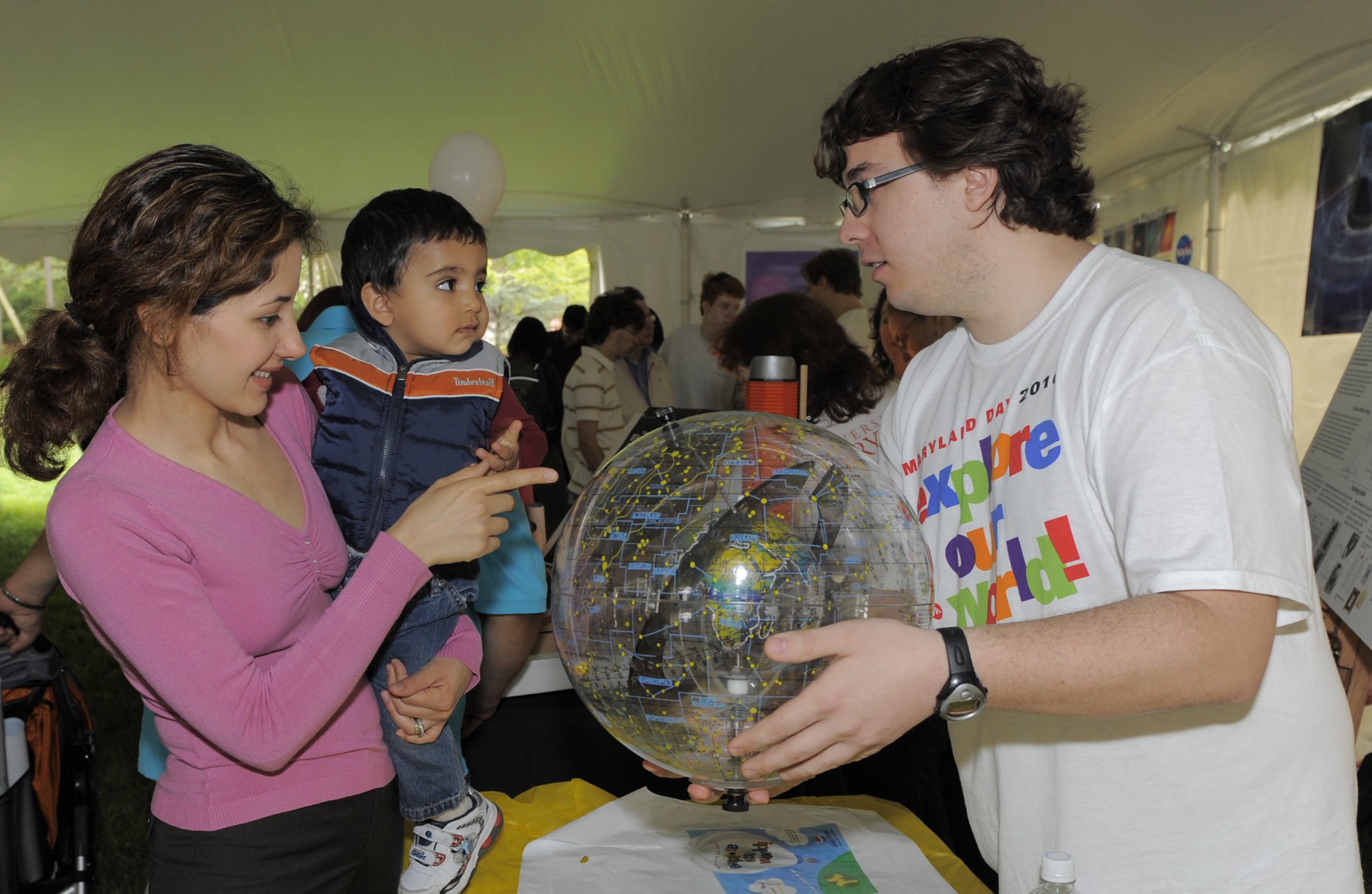
A demonstration at Maryland Day 2010

== Awards and Scholarships for Maryland Residents ==
The Maryland Science Center annually recognizes and celebrates scientific research and academic achievement through the following scholarship and awards offered to outstanding Maryland residents:

- Dr. H. Bently Glass Scholarship
- Maryland’s Outstanding Young Scientist Award
- Maryland’s Outstanding Young Engineer Award
- Maryland’s Outstanding STEM Educator Award
