= St. Paul and Calvert streets =

One-way pair of streets in Baltimore, Maryland

Coordinates: 39°19′4″N 76°36′53.2″W

St. Paul Street−Light Street Calvert Street
- Interactive map of St. Paul Street−Light Street; Calvert Street
- Owner: City of Baltimore
- Location: Baltimore
- Postal code: 21201, 21202, 21218
- North end: Charles Street (St. Paul St.); University Parkway (Calvert St.)
- South end: E. Wells Street (as Light St.); E. Pratt Street (as Calvert St.)

St. Paul Street and Calvert Street are a one-way pair of streets in Downtown Baltimore and areas north. The streets, which are part of Maryland Route 2, are two of Baltimore's best-known streets in the downtown area.

== St. Paul Street ==
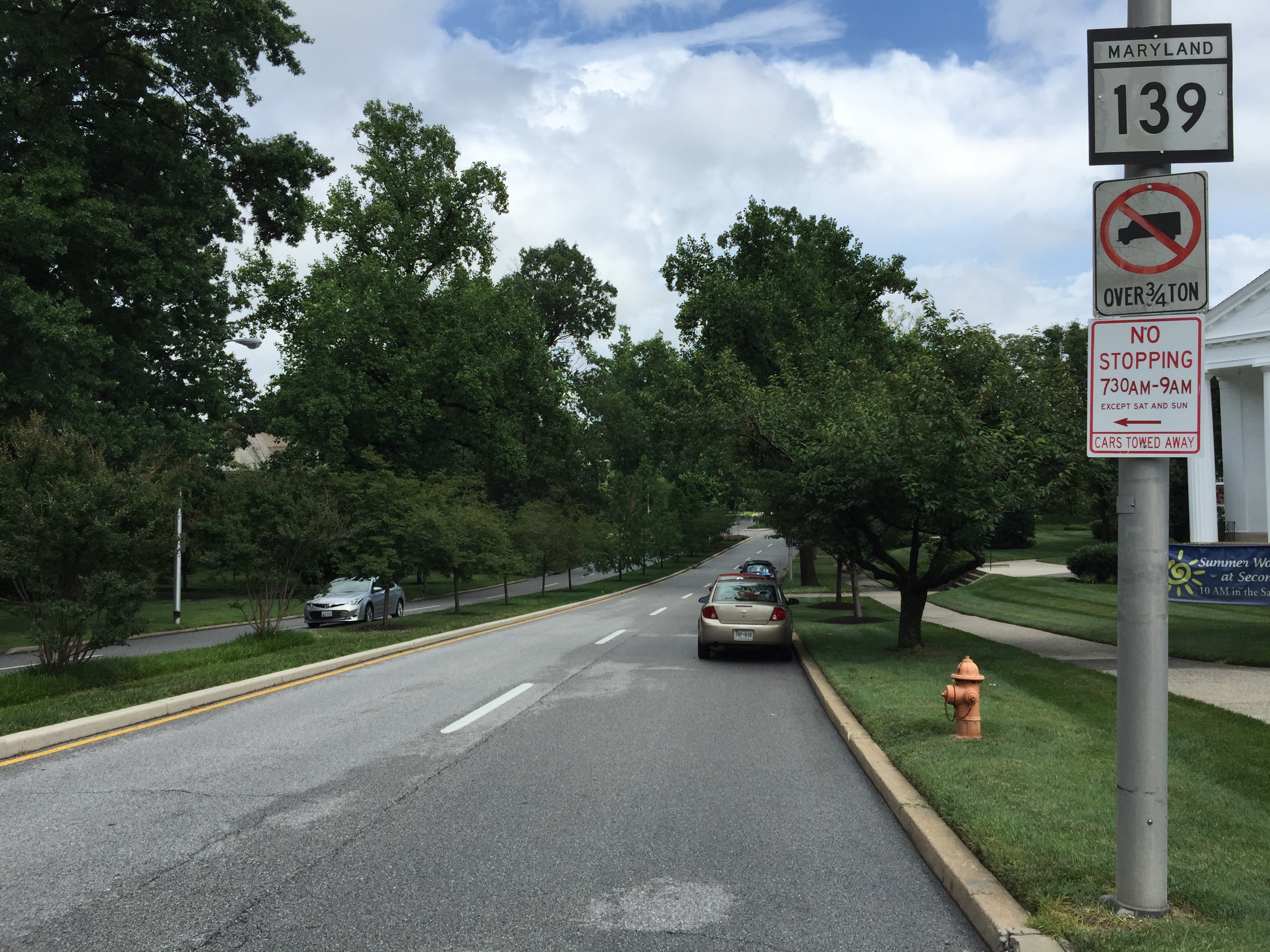
View south near the north end of St. Paul Street

St. Paul Street begins off Charles Street just south of Coldspring Lane near Loyola College (now renamed Loyola University Maryland) From this point on, the street runs directly parallel to North Charles Street, exactly one block east of Charles Street. It carries Maryland Route 139 in the southbound direction until intersecting North Avenue (formerly Boundary Avenue with northern city limits of 1818–1888) (U.S. Route 1), where MD 139 ends.

St. Paul Street is two ways until the intersection with 31st Street. Northbound traffic is relegated to a single northbound lane, separated by median, and with metered parallel parking.

St. Paul Street is exit 4 off the Jones Falls Expressway (I-83). Approaching the downtown area moving south between East Centre and Lexington Streets, St. Paul Street is split into two parallel, nearby streets, also being identified as St. Paul Place in this area. The wider eastern thoroughfare was the former narrow alley-like Courtland Street, once flanked by rows of small brick and stone townhouses. While the more westward of the two sides of St. Paul Street/Place intersects with all east–west streets within these blocks, the eastward opposite wider side passes under the Orleans Street Viaduct (US 40). The area between the two St. Paul streets, landscaped into terraced gardens and parks with fountains are known as Preston Gardens, replaced a group of 1820s, 1830s and 1840s of Georgian, Federal and Greek Revival styled architecture townhouses which had supposedly become shabby by the early 20th century along narrow alley-like Courtland Street and the original parallel St. Paul Street. The district had become home to many African American / black professional offices of doctors, lawyers, and a number of schools, educational / cultural organizations and institutions plus several churches in those tightly packed blocks from the early 19th century of which many of the residences would be valuable architectural treasures now a century later. Unfortunately, the five square blocks north to south along St. Paul and Courtland were razed beginning in 1919 as the city's first "urban renewal" project and was laid out in a Classical Revival style architecture and landscaped the terraces, staircases and fountains by noted architect Thomas Hastings (1860–1929). The remaining black and white historical photographs archived in the libraries and historical society are all that's left to show the appearance long ago of this picturesque residential neighborhood and its Baltimore style rowhouses architecture streetscape just on the northern edge of Downtown, similar to others on the western and eastern sides.

Preston Gardens landscaped terraces constructed on five square blocks north to south of razed / cleared townhouses and educational / cultural instructions along with several churches on the northern edge of downtown during the early 1920s, were named for James H. Preston (1860–1938), who was the 37th Mayor of the City of Baltimore (served 1911–1919), and earlier as the Speaker in 1894 of the Maryland House of Delegates (the lower chamber of the General Assembly of Maryland) in the historic Maryland State House on State Circle of the state capital of Annapolis of which he served 1890–1894.

=== Notable landmarks ===
- Penn Station
- Mercy Hospital (now Mercy Medical Center), originally located on parallel eastward Calvert Street at East Saratoga Street since 1870s.

== Calvert Street ==
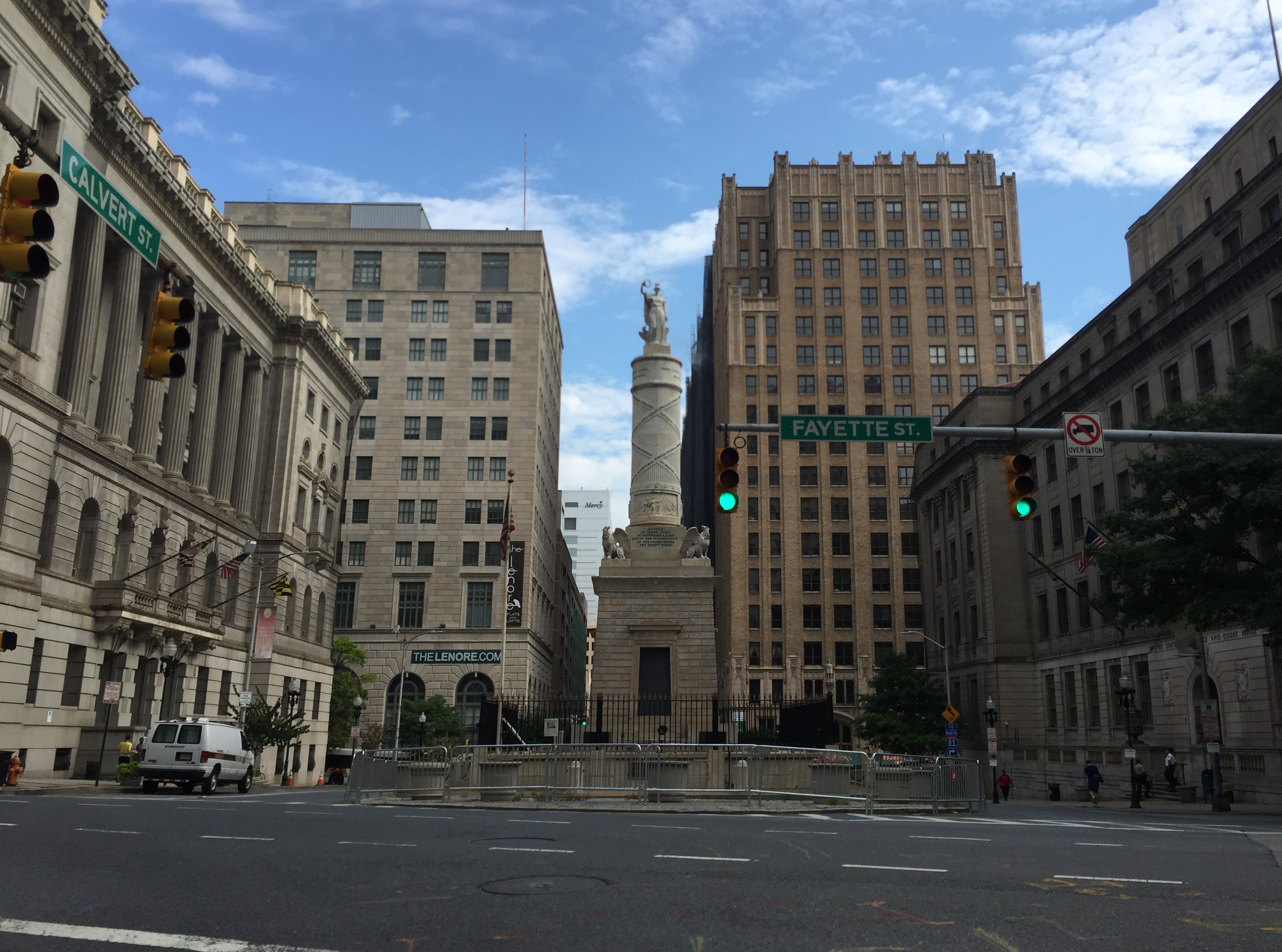
Looking north towards the Battle Monument of 1815–1822 from the War of 1812, symbol of Baltimore on the city seal and flag on North Calvert Street, between East Fayette and Lexington Streets flanked by two municipal courthouses

As St. Paul Street is mostly one-way southbound, Calvert Street, which is directly east of St. Paul, is open to northbound traffic. North Calvert Street is a name of a portion of the street north of its intersection with East Baltimore Street. South Calvert Street is a name for the downtown portion running further south and alongside the Inner Harbor waterfront to the east.

Calvert Street begins at Pratt Street near the Inner Harbor and continues through the downtown area and various north Baltimore neighborhoods before terminating in the Guilford neighborhood. of northern Baltimore.

At its railroad and Jones Falls stream crossing near I-83, Calvert Street once had an arch-style steel/iron bridge with lions sculptures at each end, though not as interesting looking as the one on nearby Charles Street or Howard Street running parallel to the west. The present crossing on Calvert Street is ordinary-looking poured concrete construction.

=== Notable landmarks ===
- Clarence M. Mitchell Jr. Courthouse of 1896–1900 (Baltimore City Circuit Courthouse on the west side of Calvert and the Battle Monument Square and its opposite side of Elijah Cummings Courthouse East (former U.S. Courthouse and General Post Office), from 1930 to 1932)
- Battle Monument, 1815–1822, Commemorating the American officers and soldiers killed in the Battle of Baltimore (with the outlying land clash in the Battle of North Point in southeastern rural Baltimore County and the British naval bombardment a day later of Fort McHenry guarding the harbor) of September 12 to 14, 1814 in the War of 1812 (1812–1815)
- Baltimore Sun newspaper headquarters building, occupied 1950 to 2022
- Union Memorial Hospital, at University Parkway and East 33rd Street.

== Light Street ==
After passing East Baltimore Street, St. Paul Street changes its name to Light Street. Light Street becomes a large, two-way street with center divider after passing East Pratt Street (which runs along the north shore of the Inner Harbor and municipal piers 1 to 6), the point where South Calvert Street begins for northbound traffic. Light Street continues through Francis Scott Key Highway (Key Highway), passing through the Federal Hill and old South Baltimore commercial district and tightly packed rowhouse neighborhoods and the Cross Street Market, one of Baltimore's six remaining public market halls, until its southern terminus at Wells Street, just east of parallel South Hanover Street (Maryland Route 2), above the north shore of the Middle Branch of the Patapsco River and Baltimore Harbor. The street ends by the newly planned Port Covington redevelopment project on the site of War of 1812 Fort Covington, a supporting redoubt of Fort McHenry in the Battle of Baltimore, which became the Western Maryland Railway Port Covington marine terminal.

Though quite short in length, Light Street is well known in the area, forming the western boundary of the Inner Harbor tourist area. The formerly narrow cobble-stoned waterfront street clogged with horses and wagons and later early trucks was the site of the western shore piers for East Coast/Chesapeake Bay passenger steamboats such as the Old Bay Line and others in the 19th and early 20th centuries. As of 2004, the Harborplace pavilions (1980–2026), the glass walled Baltimore Visitor Center (2004) are located here along with the Maryland Science Center, founded 1797 was relocated here on the Light Street waterfront in 1976, and the former McCormick & Company offices and manufacturing plant for spices. flavorings and seasonings between 1889 originally on East Pratt Street by the Jones Falls, moved and rebuilt 1922 in a large poured white painted concrete multi-story structure up to 1989 was located facing east on Light Street at East Conway Street, opposite the Inner Harbor (today the site of a shiny glass apartment / condo tower built 2018).

Light Street is named for Capt. Darby Lux I (1695–1750), an early sea captain / mariner, major merchant and civic leader in the colonial era of the mercantile history of Baltimore who had a house on the waterfront street. The curved traffic spur connecting the street to Calvert Street will close permanently in November 2026 as part of the Harborplace Redevelopment, which includes the permanent closure and demolition of the Light Street Pavilion.
