= Robert Baker Park =

Pocket park in Baltimore, Maryland, US

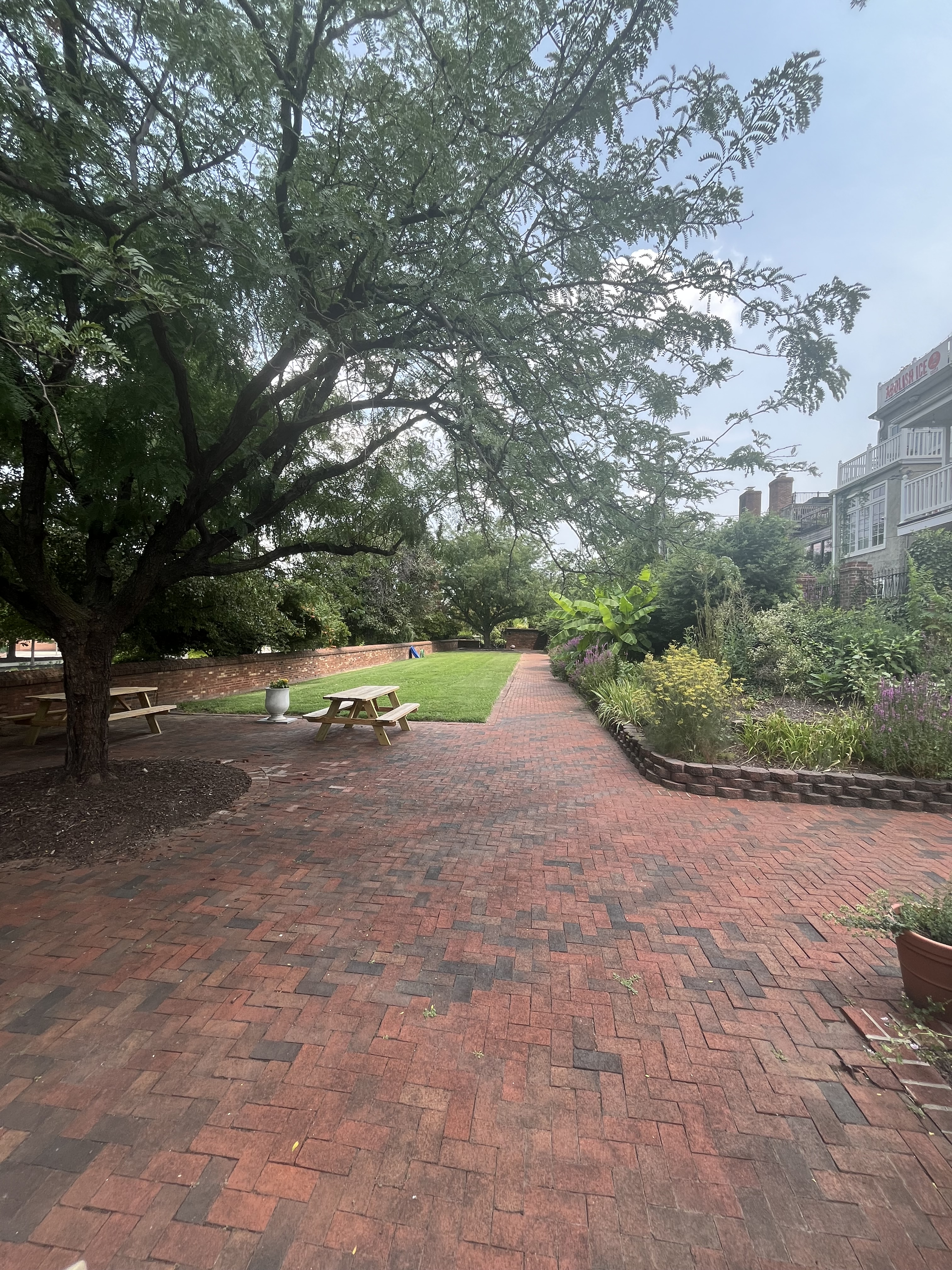
- Robert Baker Park (in red, click to enlarge)
- Interactive map of Robert Baker Park
- Type: Public park
- Location: 101 Key Highway, at Light Street, Baltimore, Maryland, US
- Coordinates: 39°16′49.4″N 76°36′43.6″W
- Area: approximately 0.668 acre
- Created: circa 1982
- Operator: City of Baltimore

Robert Baker Park is a pocket park on the northern perimeter of Federal Hill neighborhood of Baltimore, Maryland, United States. It is very near the foot of Federal Hill Park, south of the city's central business district, and close to the city's Inner Harbor. It sits within the Federal Hill Montgomery Street Historic District, which was elevated to the National Register of Historic Places in 1970.

In contrast to its small size, the park is a reminder of the significant and successful effort in the early 1970s to mediate between Federal transportation initiatives — that had proposed fourteen lanes of traffic through historic Federal Hill and a tunnel underneath the city's prominent and historic Federal Hill Park — and concerted local advocacy and activism on behalf of the community.

The pocket park is named after Robert Lewis Baker, an early and vocal activist for Federal Hill and the neighborhoods of South Baltimore; widely recognized horticulturalist and botanist at the University of Maryland and prominent resident of the Federal Hill neighborhood.

== Park ==
Bounded by Key Highway to the North, by Light Street to the west, and overlooked by several dozen historic residential townhouses to the east and south, the park sometimes appears on maps, colloquially as Gateway Park — because of its location near where cars enter the Federal Hill neighborhood, coming from downtown Baltimore.

Access to the park is via a brick walkway off Light Street, where a plaque inside the entrance originally featured a profile of Robert Baker in black stone, with "Robert Lewis Baker, 1937-1979." The easily overlooked park is approximately 100' x 300' in size, or about two thirds of an acre, and features a walled field with perimeter planting to the south, numerous trees, a low wall to the north and west, and a brick walkway traversing its interior.

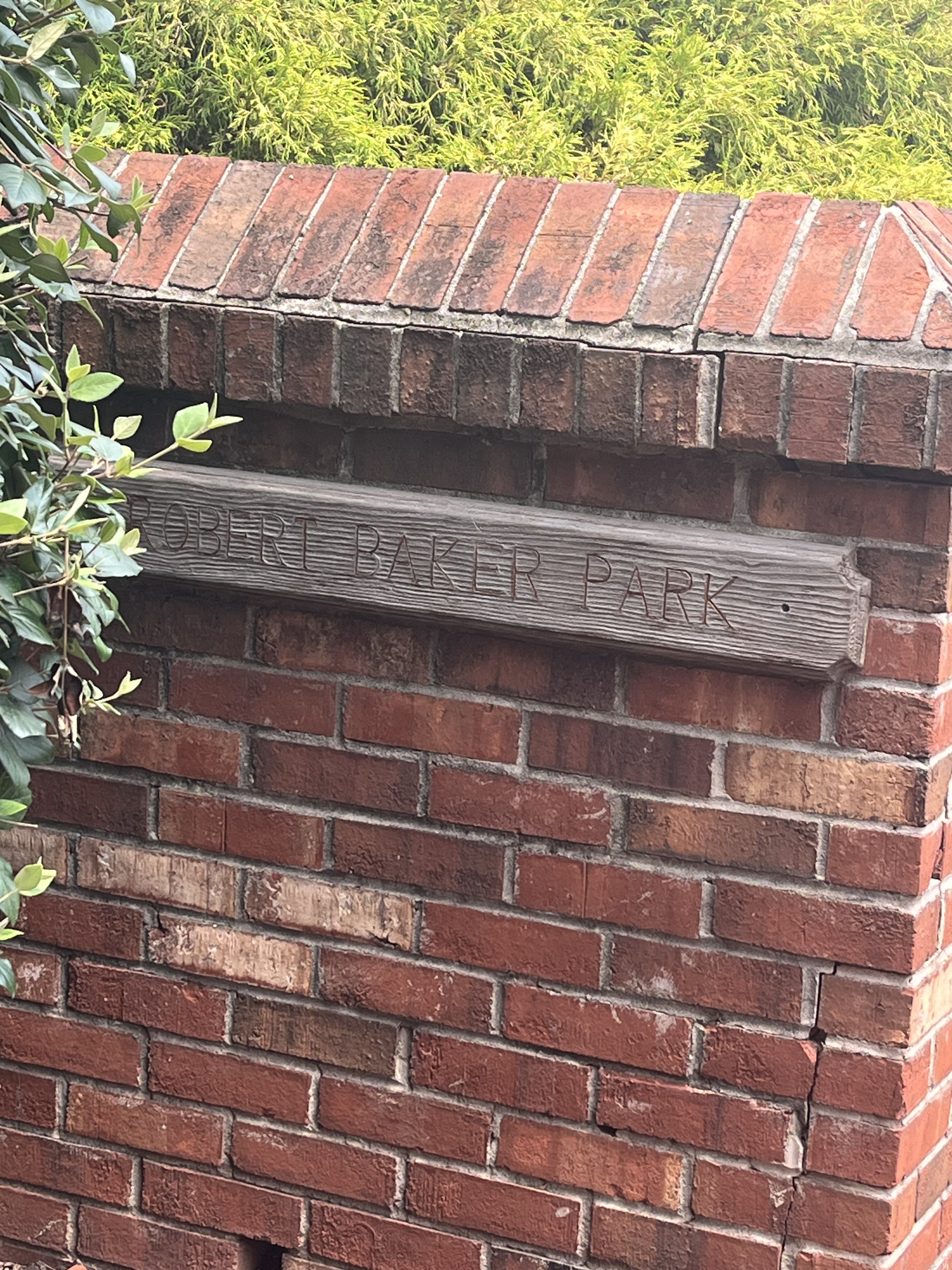
Sign at entrance of the park

By 2007, the park had become overgrown, went unlisted with the Department of Recreation and Parks, and went unnamed on most city maps. Various congregations and citizens groups worked to clean up the park. Today it falls under the purview of the Society for the Preservation of Federal Hill and Fells Point, as well as the South Baltimore Gateway Project, the latter which was formed in 2016 to manage dedicated community resources. Community members maintain a Facebook page, Robert Baker Park Federal Hill, to enable ongoing volunteer maintenance and awareness.

A 14'x 20' sculpture — titled In the Garden, Woman and Man (often shortened to In the Garden), by Baltimore artist Sam Christian Holmes — was placed at the northwest corner of the park in 2018, visible to those entering the neighborhood from downtown Baltimore. The sculpture was dedicated in February 2019, by its prime fund-raiser, the Baltimore Office of Promotion and the Arts, and the Federal Hill Neighborhood Association (FHNA).

== Origins ==
The history of the Robert Baker Park extends to the period of Baltimore's history when much of South Baltimore's housing stock lay in a severe state of dilapidation, and pressures mounted to cut major roadways directly through the neighborhoods. Interstate Highway plans overlaid the historic district; leading to a period of controversy and litigation between highway planners and preservationists. At the time, "14 lanes of traffic were to tunnel under Federal Hill Park." Much of the subsequent process was captured in a 1975 document, Mitigating Adverse Environmental Effects of Highway Construction (1975) by the Transportation Research Board National Research Council.

As the property fell within its then new status on the National Register of Historic Places, a Section 106 Review was invoked requiring the federal agency (i.e., the Department of Transportation) to assess the effect of its actions on historic resources:

A compromise was suggested by the mayor; the Federal Hill community was to be actively involved in developing a highway plan that would reflect its concern for the preservation of the historic area. Community meetings were organized to help people to understand the many problems that had resulted from years of mistrust and indecision. A survey of the area was then conducted. This survey proved useful in clarifying the goals of historic preservation so that plans could be developed for an alignment that would meet those goals.

Detailed studies, drawings and models followed extensive community meetings, with the Section 106 Review defining what would become the park:

Another major problem was the minimization of the visual and acoustical impacts of the roadway on the historic district. The suggested solution involves the creation of an open-space buffer by means of brick walls and landscape earth berms along the entire edge of the boulevard adjacent to Federal Hill.

Key activists in the process were prominent Federal Hill residents Robert Lewis Baker, officer of the Society for the Preservation of Federal Hill and Fells Point, and Dr. George A. Klein — at the time, President of the Federal Hill Neighborhood Association and history Professor with the University of Maryland.

Federal Hill-Montgomery Street residents made several suggestions, including developing a garden or promenade park that would replace the vandalized row houses along Hughes Street. (It was questionable whether the Hughes Street houses could be restored.) The design and detail of a plan for the garden will accentuate the historic quality and beauty of nearby residential structures. In an earlier plan for the boulevard, an attractive neighborhood fire station was to be taken. The community insisted that the station be saved along with the historic homes to the west of it. This resulted in the decision to have all these structures remain in their present location and the homes restored.

The buffer park was thus proposed and well under development by 1974: a "Williamsburg-type" walled and elevated park. Preliminarily designed by Roger E. Holtman, a Baltimore-based landscape architect-planner, the buffer park would include a fountain and plantings — and run from Light Street to Williams Street, providing an elevated view to the Inner Harbor. A portion of Hughes Street would become a four lane (rather than fourteen lane) section of the Key Highway, crossing in front of Federal Hill.

Opposition by the Federal Hill Neighborhood Association was ameliorated by the park. Abandoned homes and properties on what was then Hughes Street, were condemned to make room for the proposed buffer park. In 1976 the corner property at Williams Street and Hughes street was purchased out of condemnation — preventing the proposed buffer park from stretching the entire block

Important aspects of the community design process stood out, in retrospect:

"Several important factors emerge as having been decisive in reconciling the various viewpoints involved in the Federal Hill project and in developing plans satisfactory to groups whose interests differ so greatly. Those factors, which figured in achieving the compromise between residents of the historic district and the Interstate Division for Baltimore City, are:

1. Direct and open communication,
2. Concern for more issues than merely moving traffic volumes, and
3. Serious interest in minimizing harmful highway impacts.

The mayor of Baltimore and his staff established direct communication with the community organization. Opposing views thus could be aired, and the problems faced by each side were more readily appreciated. The design consultants found that their greatest effort lay in communication. Their initial task was to understand the goals of the community and its assessment of the highway. The design consultants came to appreciate the concern about the derelict and decaying structures on Hughes Street and the image that the residents wanted their district to project. The consultants felt it essential to substantiate the reasons for various aspects of the proposal with proper technical information. The scale model and detailed drawings prepared for the residents of Federal Hill helped in achieving that goal."

== Robert Lewis Baker ==
Robert (Bob) Lewis Baker was born in Baltimore and grew up in Baltimore's Bolton Hill area. Having graduated from Baltimore City College and Swarthmore College, Baker received his MS and Ph.D. degrees from the University of Maryland. He ultimately became a widely recognized assistant professor of horticulture and associate professor of botany with the University of Maryland, and an internationally recognized plantsman. Considered an expert on urban gardens, Baker published numerous horticultural articles; the book Pruning Ornamental Trees & Shrubs; and the small booklet, A Small City Garden: A Beginners Guide. In addition to traveling to Europe and Asia, including Japan in 1974 to study Japanese gardening principles, he lectured widely in the Baltimore area, on topics ranging from Federal Hill architecture — to plant selection for year-round interest. Baker died on October 31, 1979, at Johns Hopkins Hospital after a two year turn with hepatitis, at age 42.
