= Inner Harbor =

- Neighborhood
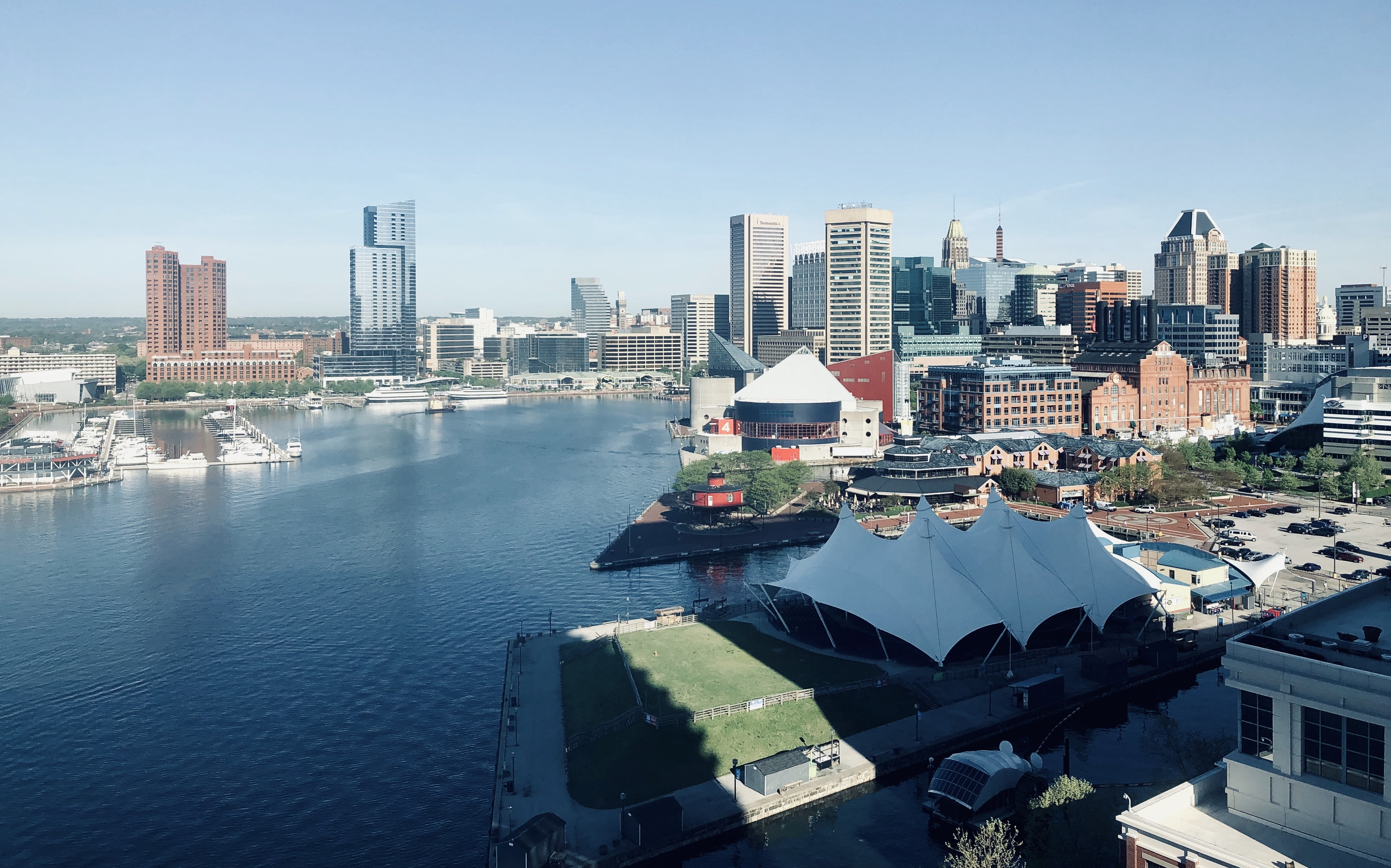
- The Inner Harbor in Baltimore in August 2020

- Location within Baltimore Location within Maryland
- Coordinates: 39°17′0″N 76°36′36″W
- Country: United States
- State: Maryland
- City: Baltimore

Population
  - Total: 1,839

The Inner Harbor is a historic seaport, tourist attraction, and landmark in Baltimore, Maryland. It was described by the Urban Land Institute in 2009 as "the model for post-industrial waterfront redevelopment around the world". The Inner Harbor is located at the mouth of Jones Falls, creating the wide and short northwest branch of the Patapsco River, whose tidal waters flow into the Chesapeake Bay. The district includes any water west of a line drawn between the foot of President Street and the American Visionary Art Museum.

The name "Inner Harbor" is used not just for the water but for the surrounding area of the city, with approximate street boundaries of President Street to the east, Lombard Street to the north, Greene Street to the west, and Key Highway on the south. The harbor is within walking distance of Oriole Park at Camden Yards and M&T Bank Stadium – as well as the city's prominent Federal Hill Park and the adjacent pocket park, Robert Baker Park. A water taxi connects passengers to Fells Point, Canton, and Fort McHenry.

== History ==
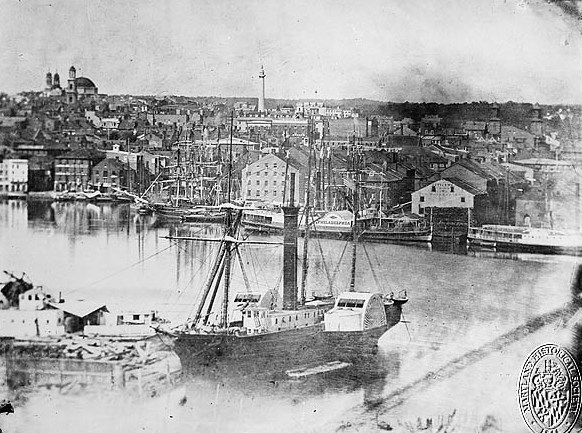
Baltimore's Inner Harbor seen from Federal Hill with the Washington Monument in the background in 1849

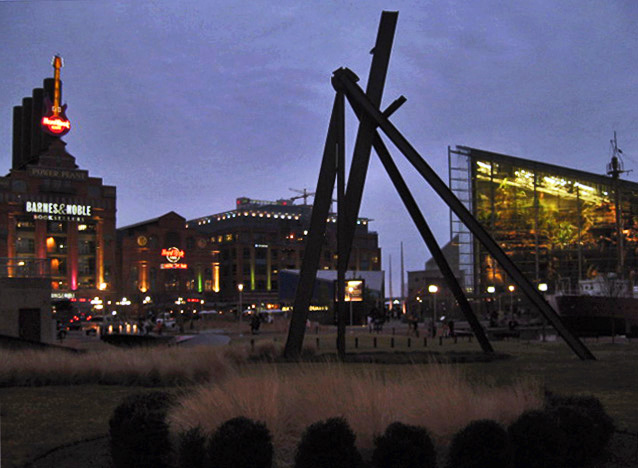
The Inner Harbor neighborhood is centered on a tourism-friendly plaza that surrounds part of the harbor.

While Baltimore has been a major U.S. seaport since the 18th century, the historically shallow water of the Inner Harbor, never more than 15 feet (4.6 m) deep prior to its manipulation through dredging, was not conducive to large ships or heavy industry. These were concentrated in Locust Point, Fell's Point, and Canton.

In the mid-20th century, Baltimore suffered from the economic decline of restructuring common to many industrial cities in the United States. Old harbors were abandoned with the arrival of container ships after World War II. Later, the old harbors were adapted as focal points to reconnect cities with their waterfronts, and develop public spaces, tourism, business, and housing.

During the 1940s, John H. Threadgill, the head of the Steamship Trade Association, initiated a study for a cross-harbor bridge. A bridge across the Inner Harbor of Baltimore was one idea that was discussed frequently. In his capacity as head of the association, Threadgill ultimately recommended that the idea for a cross-harbor bridge be abandoned, due to the fact that Baltimore relied heavily on a shipping trade and fears that the bridge would negatively impede the flow of shipping traffic at the Port of Baltimore. Threadgill was named head of Baltimore's Port Commission during the 1950s.

In the 1950s, economic changes ended both the freight and passenger use of the Inner Harbor, such as the Old Bay Line's steamers, which had carried overnight passengers and freight down the Chesapeake Bay between Baltimore and Norfolk, Virginia, until the line ceased operations in 1962. Rotting warehouses and piers were eventually torn down and replaced by open, grass-covered parkland that was used for recreational purposes and occasional large events.

The waterfront was gradually transformed with award-winning parks and plazas surrounded by office buildings, hotels and leisure attractions, which reversed the city's decline and became a model for urban renaissance in cities around the world. The renewal of Baltimore's Inner Harbor area began with the 33-acre (13 ha) Charles Center redevelopment plan, unveiled in March 1958 and adopted by the City Council and Mayor Thomas D'Alesandro the following year. Between 1958 and 1965, Baltimore renewed the center of its business district by rebuilding Charles Center with office buildings, hotels, and retail shops.

At the beginning of mayor Theodore R. McKeldin's second term in 1963, the redevelopment program was expanded to include 240 acres (97 ha) surrounding the Inner Harbor. Corporate headquarters and hotels were built around the shoreline of the Inner Harbor. A public park and promenade were added for leisure activity and community gatherings.

On July 4, 1976, following the rendezvous of Tall Ships in New York for the U.S. Bicentennial, eight ships from other nations visited Baltimore, where they attracted a huge number of tourists. This interest helped spur the development of other tourist attractions – including the National Aquarium, Maryland Science Center, and the Harborplace festival marketplace (operated by The Rouse Company), which opened on July 2, 1980. The nearby Baltimore Convention Center and Hyatt Regency Baltimore Hotel added to the services and resulted in population density and visitors.

With the success of the Inner Harbor in the 1970s and 1980s, Baltimore became a worldwide tourist destination and model of urban planning and development. It influenced as many as 100 other cities and won more than 40 national or international awards, including a citation by the American Institute of Architects in 1984 as "one of the supreme achievements of large-scale urban design and development in U.S. history".

The area along the waterfront to the east of the Inner Harbor (in the direction of Fells Point and Little Italy) has been developed with condominiums, retail space, restaurants, and hotels – an ongoing project known as Harbor East.

While little development land remains around the Inner Harbor, the available land has been subject to many plans, which have not been realized. Completed projects include mixed-use developments incorporating office space, street-level retail, and condominiums, as well as hotel projects such as the Ritz-Carlton Residences, a condominium project completed in 2008 on Key Highway at the southeast corner of the Inner Harbor.

In September 2003, the Inner Harbor area was flooded by the storm surge of Hurricane Isabel, which pushed record-high water levels up the Chesapeake Bay. The Baltimore World Trade Center remained closed for more than a month after the surge filled its basement with about 3,000,000 US gallons (11,000 m^{3}) of water, destroying the electrical, mechanical, and telecommunications systems that served the building and displacing roughly 60 tenant businesses.

In March 2004, a water taxi capsized during a storm on the Northwest Branch of the Patapsco River near Fort McHenry. While occurring over a mile downstream of the Inner Harbor, the accident was associated with the Inner Harbor by news reports and casual observers. Five passengers died in the accident, which the National Transportation Safety Board determined was caused when the small pontoon-style vessel encountered unpredictable strong winds and waves.

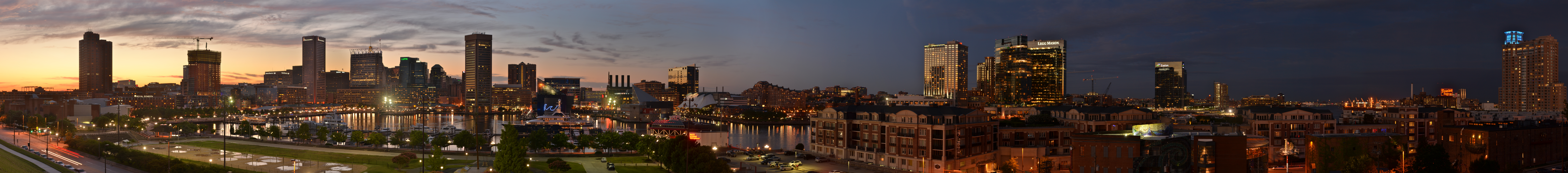
Baltimore's Inner Harbor at sunset in 2017 (panorama scrolls left and right)

== Attractions ==
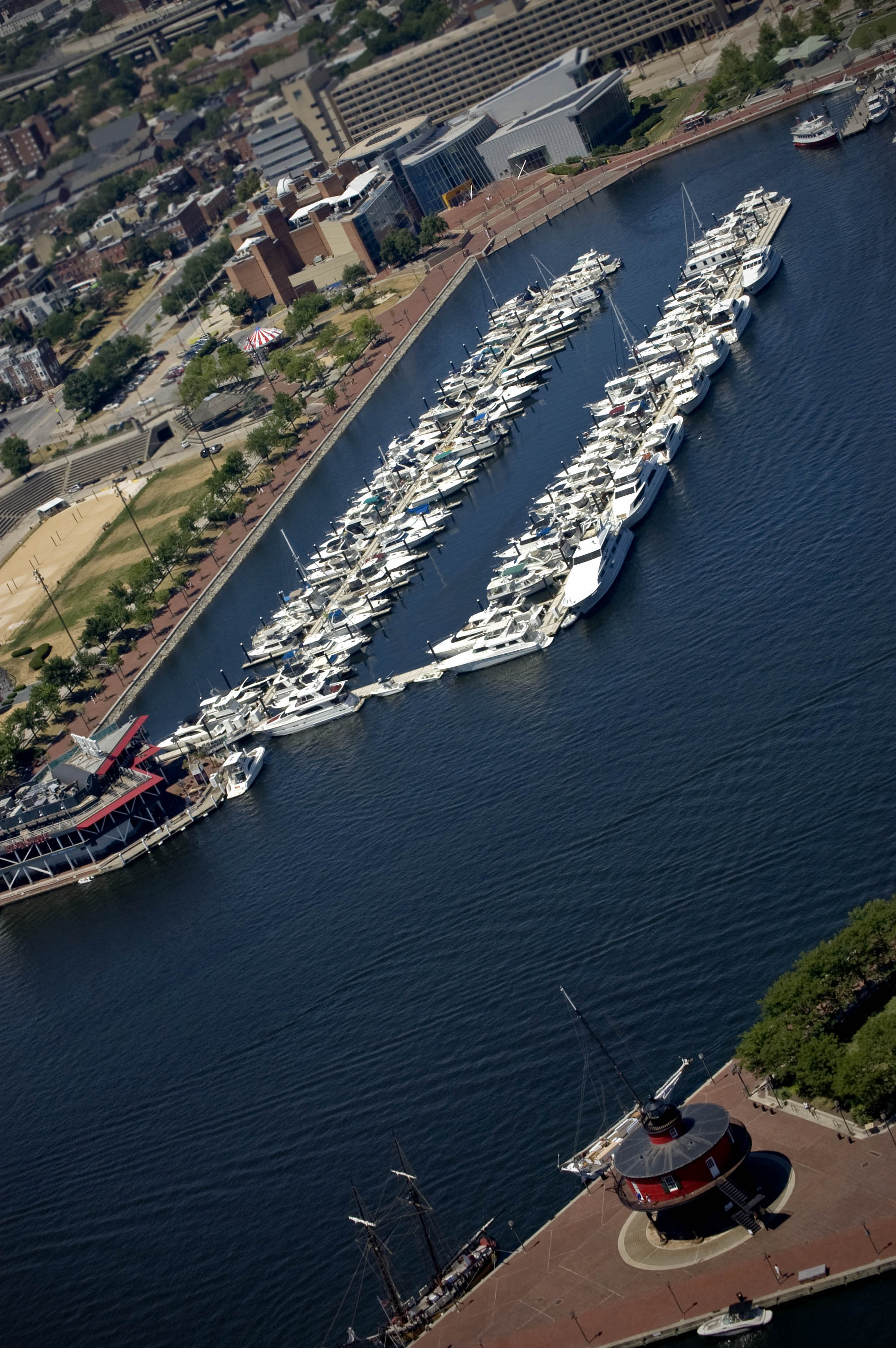
View of Inner Harbor Marina and Lighthouse in July 2010

=== Museums ===
- American Visionary Art Museum
- Baltimore Museum of Industry
- Civil War Museum at President Street Station
- Jewish Museum of Maryland at Lloyd Street Synagogue
- Maryland Science Center
- National Museum of Dentistry
- Port Discovery Children's Museum on the site of the historic Baltimore fish market
- Reginald F. Lewis Museum of Maryland African American History & Culture

=== Ships ===
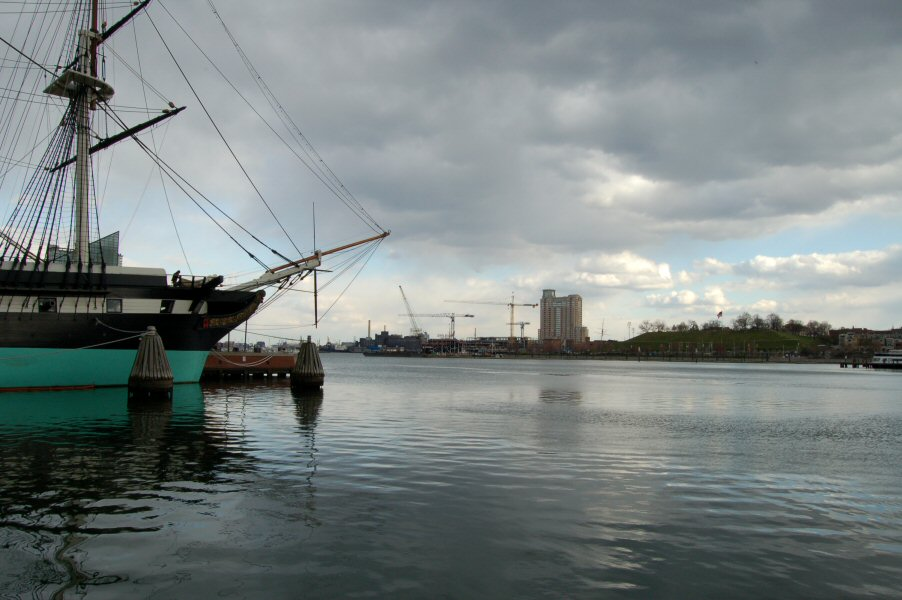
View from the Inner Harbor in April 2007

- Historic Ships in Baltimore:
  - US Coast Guard Cutter WHEC-37 – last fighting ship still afloat that survived the attack on Pearl Harbor
  - USS Torsk – Tench-class submarine; last ship to sink enemy vessel in World War II
  - Lightship Chesapeake
  - Seven Foot Knoll Lighthouse
  - USS Constellation – only Civil War-era ship still afloat
- Vessels on active/reserve status:
  - SS Wright – US Navy Aviation Logistics Support (roll-on/roll-off) container ship
- Former vessels
  - USNS Comfort – US Navy hospital ship (in Baltimore through March 2013)

=== Entertainment venues ===
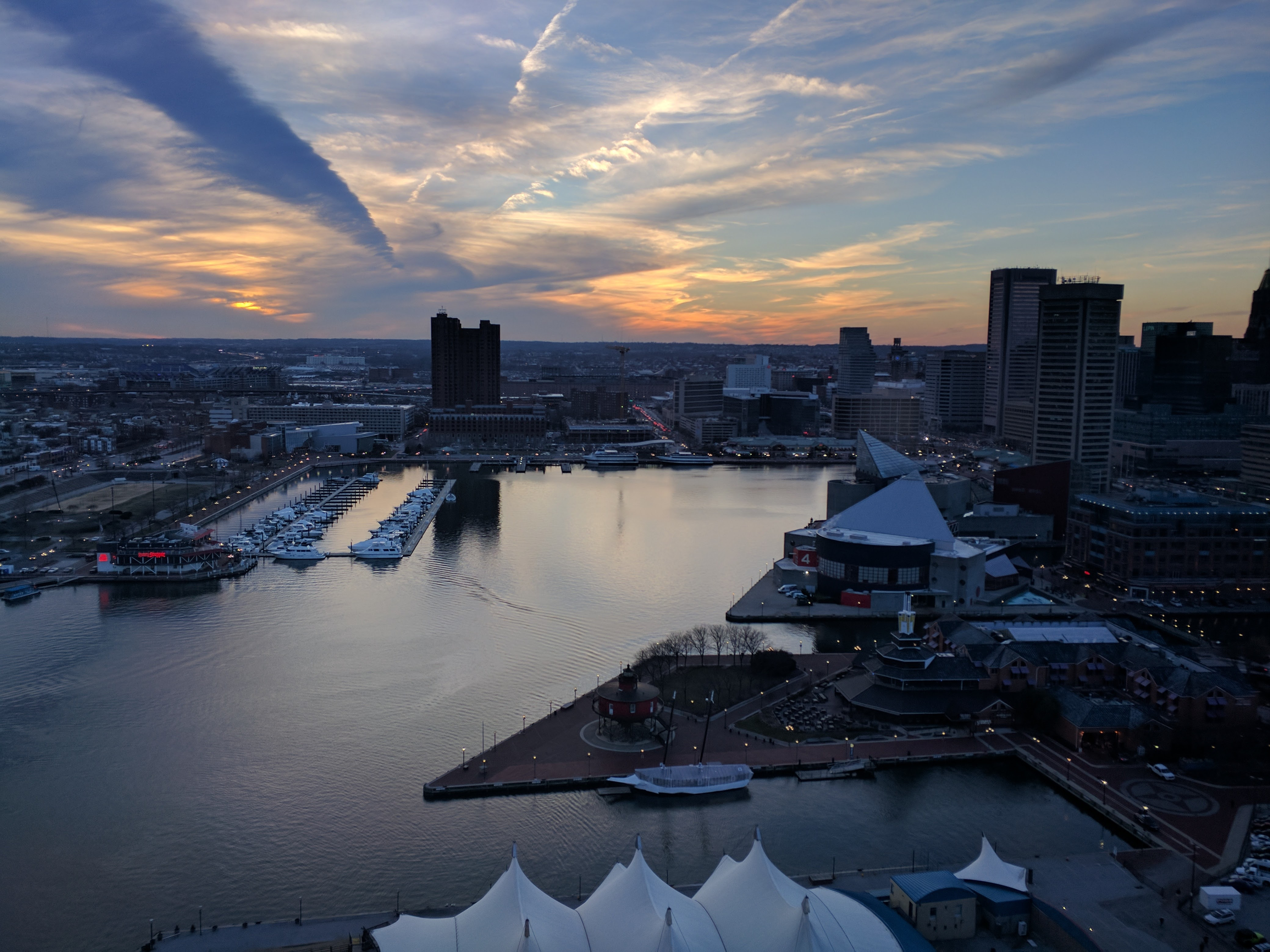
Sunset at Baltimore's Inner Harbor with the top of the Pier Six Pavilion, a music venue on the Inner Harbor, visible in the foreground

==== Sports ====
- Babe Ruth Birthplace and Museum
- Baltimore Grand Prix, a street race for Indycar and American Le Mans Series
- Camden Yards Sports Complex
  - M&T Bank Stadium, home of the Baltimore Ravens
  - Oriole Park at Camden Yards, home of the Baltimore Orioles

==== Concert halls and arenas ====
- Baltimore Convention Center
- CFG Bank Arena (formerly known by various other names)
- Pier Six Pavilion
- Power Plant Live!, a collection of bars and clubs that includes Nevermore Hall (formerly Rams Head Live!)
- Hippodrome Theatre

=== Notable architecture ===
- National Katyń Memorial
- Bnai Israel – an active Moorish Revival synagogue

The Lloyd Street Synagogue, just up the street, is a museum. Between the two synagogue buildings is the Jewish Museum of Maryland.

=== Other attractions ===
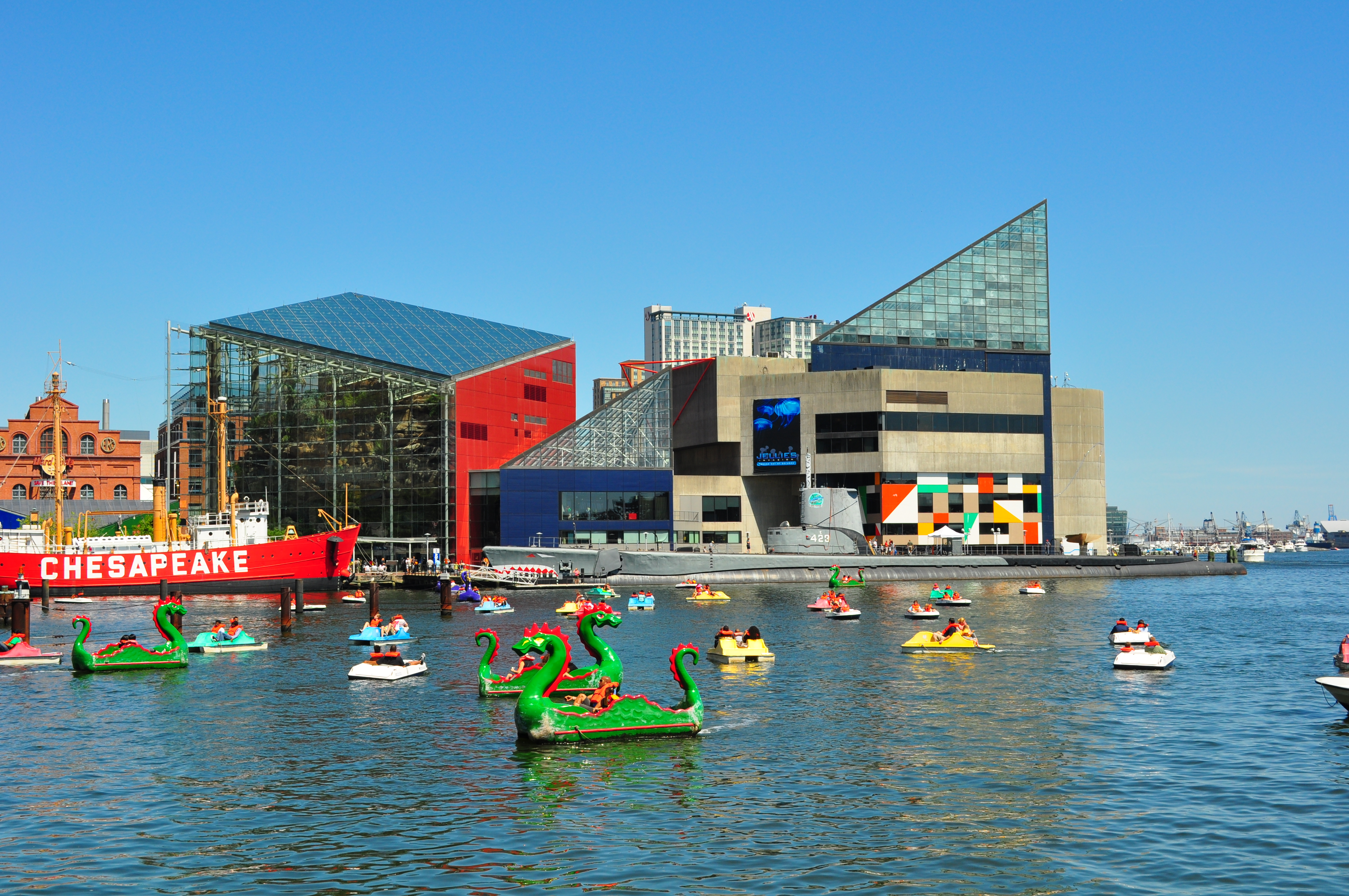
The National Aquarium in the Inner Harbor

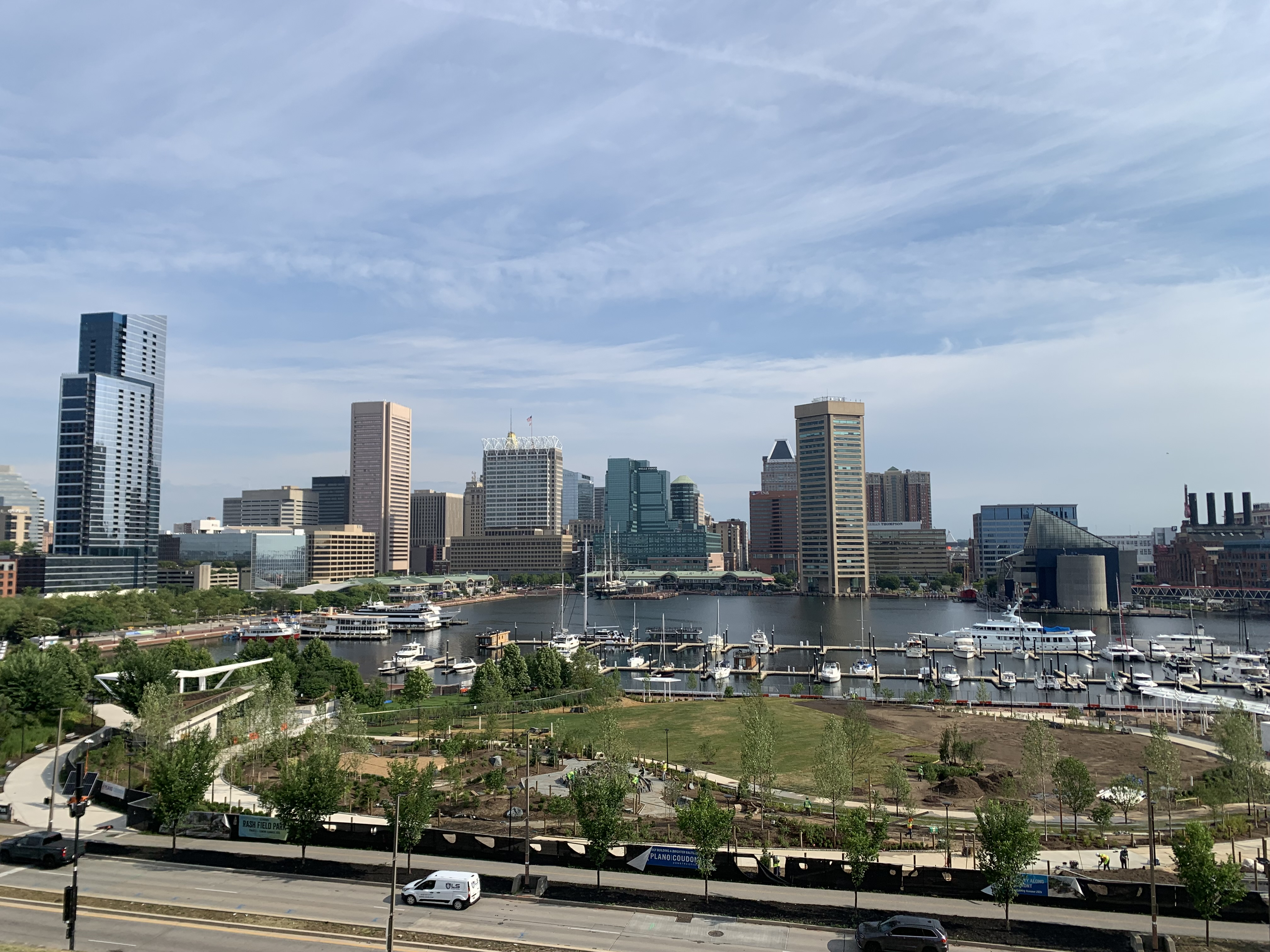
View of Baltimore's Inner Harbor from Federal Hill, June 2026

- National Aquarium in Baltimore
- Maryland Science Center
- Harborplace Redevelopment (coming soon)
- The Pratt Street Power Plant (containing Hard Rock Cafe and other tenants, and formerly the original ESPN Zone, which closed in June 2010, along with Barnes & Noble, which closed its doors in 2020.)
- Top of the World at the Baltimore World Trade Center
- Holocaust Memorial
- Columbus Center, home of the University of Maryland Biotechnology Institute
- Lockwood Place
- Baltimore Visitor Center
- Harborplace pavilions
- Renaissance Harborplace Hotel
- 111 S. Calvert Street
- Lloyd Street Synagogue, the third-oldest synagogue in the United States, now a museum
- McKeldin Square
- Federal Hill Park
- Robert Baker Park
- Mechanic Theatre Redevelopment (on hold)
- Walk at Warner Street
  - Horseshoe Casino Baltimore
  - Topgolf Baltimore
  - The Ostend Baltimore (formerly The Paramount Baltimore, a concert venue coming soon)

Walk at Warner Street (stylized as Walk @ Warner Street) is an upcoming entertainment district for South Baltimore designed to connect the Horseshoe Casino to the Inner Harbor's Camden Yards Sports Complex.

Harborplace's redevelopment involves demolishing the iconic Inner Harbor pavilions developed by The Rouse Company and replacing them with 32 and 25-story apartment towers, along with a marketplace on 301 and 303 S. Light Streets, and an amphitheater and office building with retail on 201 and 203 E. Pratt Streets. The pavilions were originally scheduled to be razed starting in the fall of 2026 because they have fallen into severe disrepair due to "demolition by neglect" by Ashkenazy Acquisition Corporation for a decade, and MCB Real Estate states that the "festival marketplace" concept is considered outdated. However, demolition has been delayed as of September 2026, keeping the pavilions open at least for another year.

The Morris A. Mechanic Theatre redevelopment involves apartment towers as well, though it has been stalled indefinitely until a tax break occurs. The Brutalist-architecture theatre was closed permanently in 2004 and demolished in 2014 because of competition from the larger Hippodrome Theatre and was considered outdated for modern shows.

=== Defunct attractions ===
- Baltimore Public Works Museum (1982–2010)
- Geppi's Entertainment Museum (2006–2018)
- Ripley's Believe It or Not! Odditorium at Harborplace (2012–2020)
- Sports Legends Museum at Camden Yards (closed 2015)
- ESPN Zone Power Plant (1998–2010)
- Tin Roof Baltimore (2014–2024)
- Rams Head Live! (2004–2024)
- Morris A. Mechanic Theatre (1967–2004, demolished 2014)
- Six Flags Power Plant (1985–1987, P.T. Flagg's nightclub closed 1990)
- The Gallery (1987–2022)
- McKeldin Fountain (1982–2016)
- Sheraton Inner Harbor Hotel (1985–2025) and Morton's The Steakhouse (1997–2026)
- The Brokerage (1982–1999) – former shopping mall converted into Power Plant Live!
- The Fishmarket (1988–1989) – former nightlife venue converted into Port Discovery
- UA The Movies at Harbor Park (1985–2000)

The McKeldin Fountain was another Brutalist-architecture attraction similar to the Mechanic Theatre; it was formerly connected to the Harborplace Light Street Pavilion via a skywalk, but torn down in 2016 as part of the Inner Harbor 2.0 plan for visibility concerns and hygiene problems.

==== Sheraton Inner Harbor Hotel ====
The Sheraton Inner Harbor Hotel and Morton's The Steakhouse Baltimore (both located at 300 S. Charles Street) closed permanently on December 31, 2025, and January 9, 2026, respectively, for economic challenges and natural expiration of their leases, which resulted in 69 layoffs, leaving the lobby vacant. As of January 18, 2026, their signage had been removed.

=== Harbor Park Garage ===
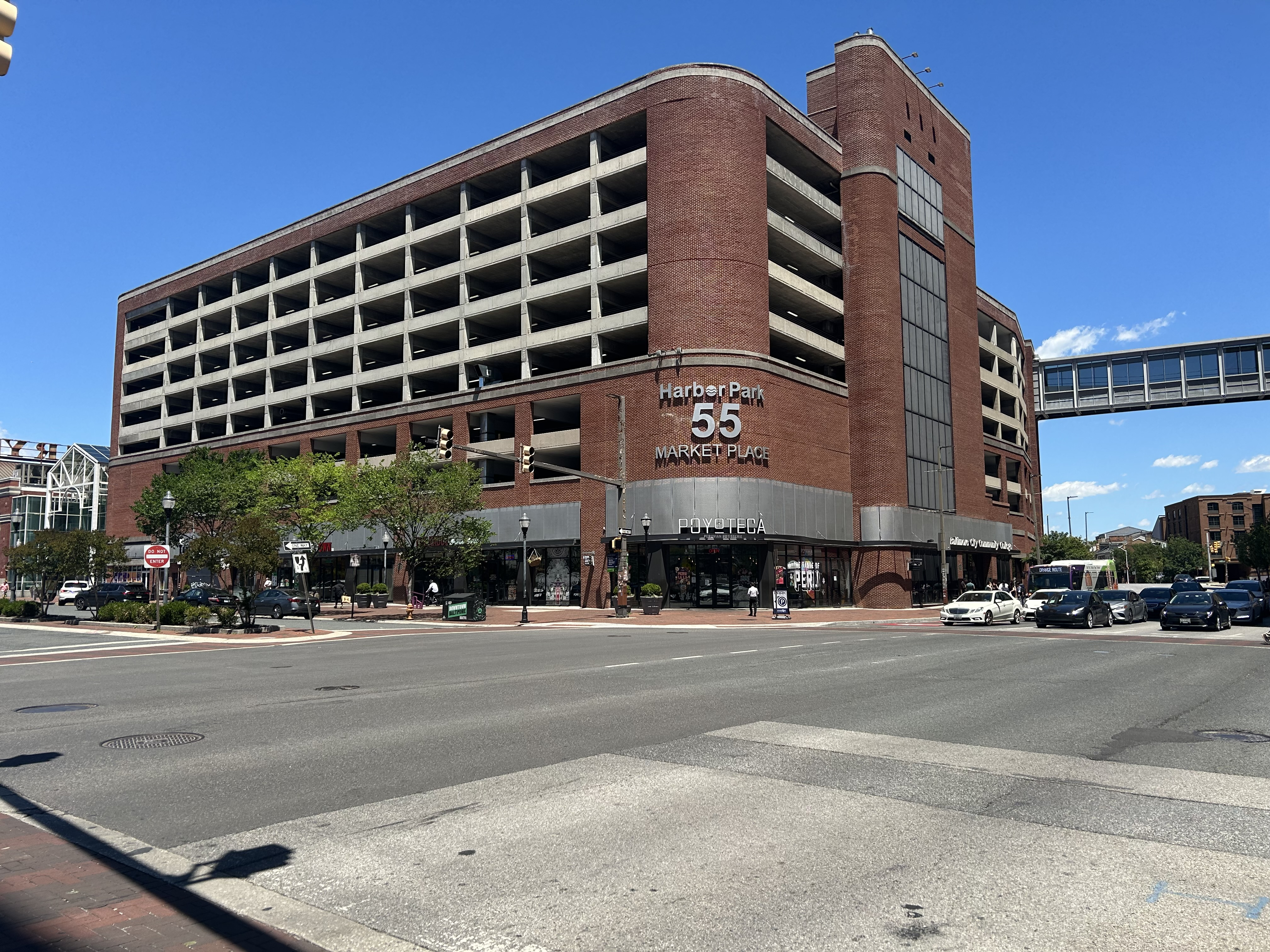
Exterior view (June 2026)

UA The Movies at Harbor Park was a United Artists movie theater at 55 Market Place and 710 E. Lombard Street, featuring nine screens and 28,000 square feet (2,600 m^{2}), originally built adjacent to The Brokerage, which opened in June 1982, and The Fishmarket, which opened in November 1988 as part of redeveloping the historic Baltimore Centre Market site. The cinema opened to the public on December 13, 1985, located on the first floor of the Harbor Park Garage, and permanently closed its doors on March 28, 2000, due to underperformance and competition from suburban movie theaters, particularly the lack of stadium seating; the parent company, United Artists Theatre Circuit Inc., also shuttered several other underperforming locations nationwide due to its financial struggles, and UA Harbor Park 9 had fallen into disrepair in its final months.

By the time of the theater closure, The Brokerage had been closed to allow for construction on Power Plant Live!, and Reed S. Cordish of the Cordish Companies publicly stated that it would "make sense" to make the former cinema part of it, though this never came to fruition. In February 1992, the site became a violent crime scene when Dontay Carter, a local, abducted patrons inside the building and beat a Catonsville father to death. In September 2001, the former facility was announced to become a downtown campus for the Baltimore City Community College (BCCC); they acquired and converted it specifically because it sat adjacent to their existing primary Harbor Campus facility at 600 E. Lombard Street. A portion of the space was converted into a 46,000 square feet (4,300 m^{2}), street-facing shopping center known as The Shops at Harbor Park; at the time, the facility featured a McDonald's (closed 2011) and the Baja Beach Club (closed 2008) as its remaining tenants after the movie theater closed, adjacent to Power Plant Live! and Port Discovery.

== Free speech ==
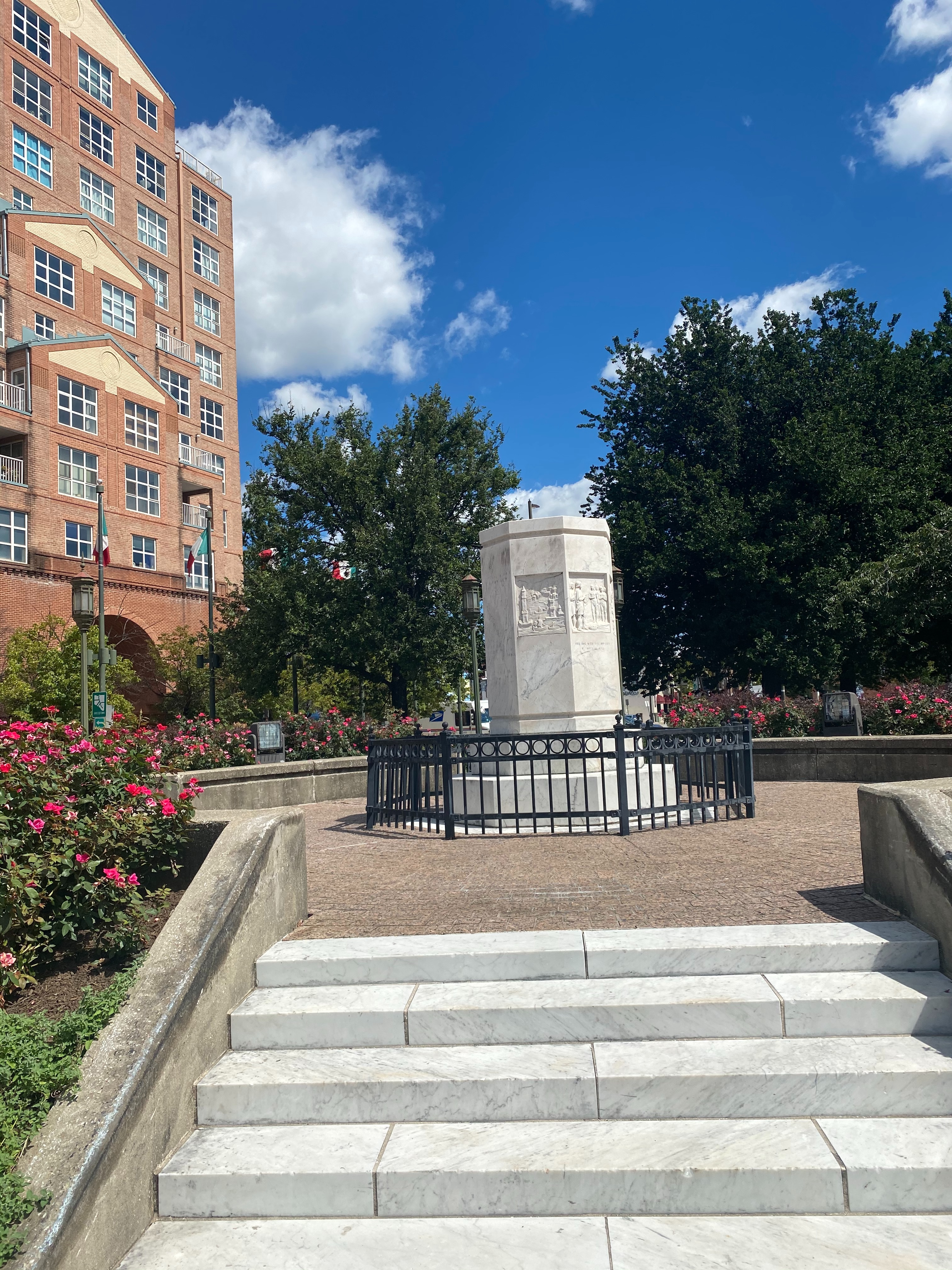
Only the pedestal base of the Christopher Columbus statue remains in Inner Harbor; on July 4, 2020, the statue was thrown into the harbor as part of the George Floyd protests.

As a central and busy part of Baltimore, the Inner Harbor has been the site of much political and artistic activity. The city is involved in ongoing disputes over free speech in the area. One early conflict concerned marchers for gay rights, whose permit was revoked by the city. (The city announced that only five or fewer people could march, and that they could not carry signs.)

The Rouse Company, which began operating Harborplace in 1980, has long been in conflict with street performers. The company regulates performances, and has often been accused of suppressing free speech. These disputes came to a head in 2002–2003, when two events triggered a lawsuit against the city.

=== ACLU lawsuit ===
On October 21, 2002, street performer Jerry Rowan was banned from the area for making an "insensitive" joke. Discussing the then-current D.C. sniper case, Rowan said: "I was driving downtown this morning, and on the radio I heard that they've finally come out with a composite of the sniper, so there should be an arrest forthcoming. Apparently, he's a white guy that speaks Spanish and looks like he's Arab." Police officers overheard the joke and reported it to Rouse. The company had previously sent a letter to Rowan admonishing him for "off-color humor", as well as "lack of respect for program administrators". After this report, the company banned him from the area.

On April 4, 2003, a police officer asked Baltimore's Women in Black to disband. The group had (and has) gathered in McKeldin Square every Friday since September 11, 2002.

Rowan and the Women in Black filed suit against the city of Baltimore on October 7, 2003, arguing their right of free speech. They were assisted by attorney Rajeev Goyle on behalf of the American Civil Liberties Union.

The lawsuit was resolved in 2013 in a settlement that resulted in a consent decree with the city, creating "instant permits" for spontaneous demonstrations and waived permit requirements for groups of 30 people or less. The negotiations with the ACLU, the city, General Growth Properties (which acquired the Rouse Co. in November 2004), and The Waterfront Partnership in the settlement yielded other specific results in favor of free speech activities. McKeldin Square, Rash Field, Kaufman Pavilion, the area West of the Visitor Center, and Area 10 were all designated as official free-speech zones. Additionally, the settlement required the City of Baltimore to pay the attorney's fees for the ACLU.

Elsewhere, police enforce rules against protest. On May 21, 2011, teacher Bruce Friedrich was threatened with arrest while handing out animal rights pamphlets. On September 18, 2011, police arrested artist Mark Chase for selling his paintings "in or near" the Inner Harbor amphitheater. "Your constitutional rights have nothing to do with the law," said the arresting officer when Chase objected on First Amendment grounds.
