= Federal Hill Park =

Public park in Baltimore, Maryland, US

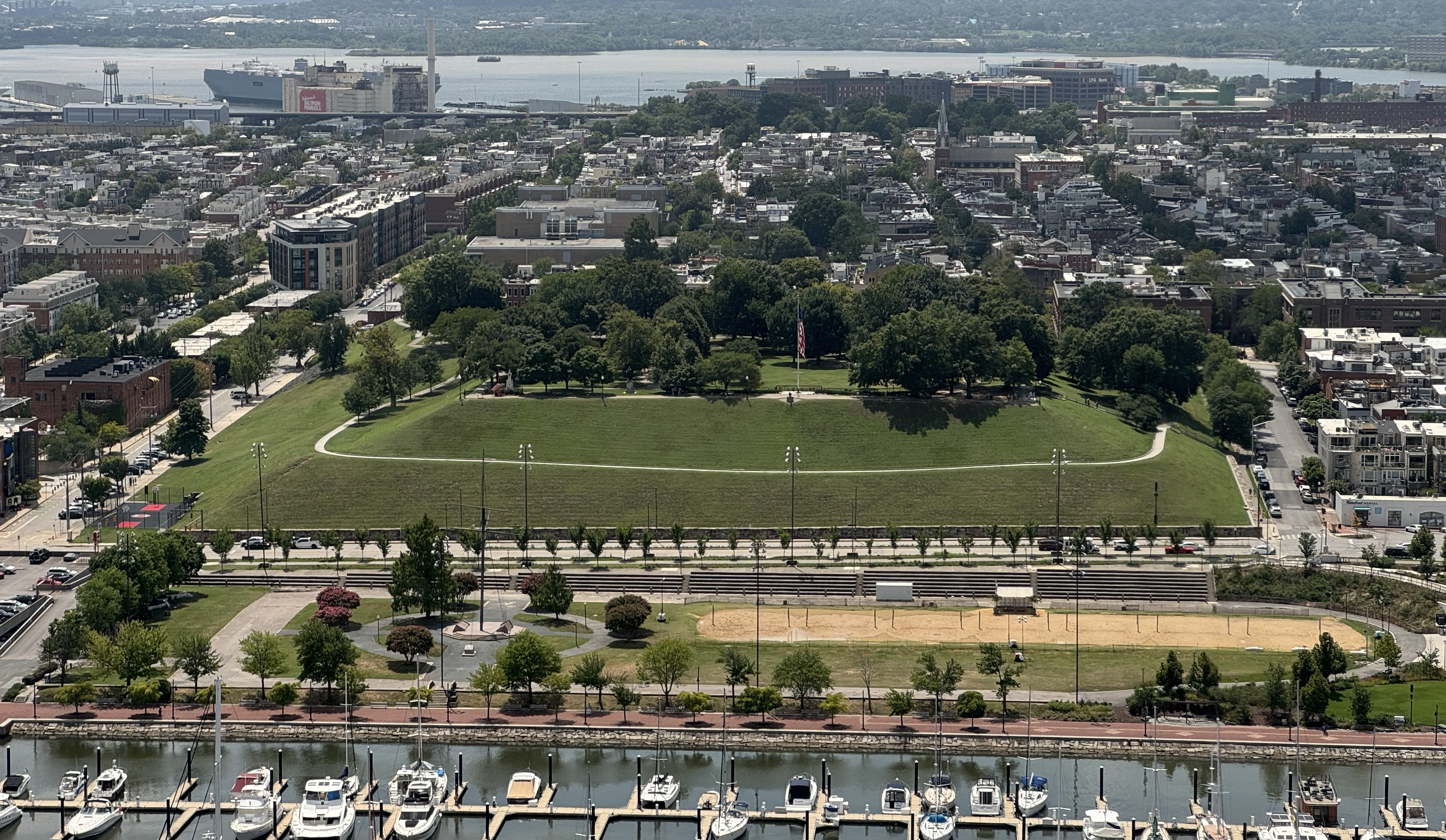
- Interactive map of Federal Hill Park
- Type: Public park
- Location: Baltimore, Maryland
- Coordinates: 39°16′47″N 76°36′31″W
- Created: 1880

Federal Hill Park is a 10.3 acres park located in Baltimore, Maryland, on the south shore of the city's Inner Harbor. The park is a signature Baltimore landmark and offers visitors prominent views of the city, which is often photographed from the park, looking north to the downtown skyline of skyscrapers, across the Inner Harbor of the Northwest Branch of the Patapsco River / Baltimore Harbor. The Federal Hill neighborhood surrounds the park, to the west and south, and is named for the prominent hill. Federal Hill and a number of adjacent neighborhoods were once commonly known as South Baltimore.

The park's current landscaped hillside, chiefly lawn, was originally jagged cliffs and bluffs of red clay, the latter which was mined in the 18th and 19th centuries after being first sighted and described by Captain John Smith of England on his voyages of exploration of the Chesapeake Bay from the first English colony at Jamestown, Virginia, in 1608.

The park today is bounded by Francis Scott Key Highway (Key Highway / Maryland Route 2) along the waterfront to the north, Battery Avenue to the west, Warren Avenue to the south, and Covington Street to the east.

The City of Baltimore acquired the hill as public property in 1880 after it was used as a fort, and fortified with heavy artillery (Fort Federal Hill) by the Union Army during the American Civil War (1861–1865). It was established at that time as a city park, operated and maintained by the city Department of Recreation and Parks.

== History ==
=== John Smith’s Hill ===
The first Englishman to discover Federal Hill Park was the celebrated English colonial explorer and settler Captain John Smith (1580–1631). In June 1608, Smith sailed from Jamestown up the Chesapeake Bay for a 19-day journey that ended with a voyage up the Patapsco River which he named "Bolus" for "red". It was there that Smith reported seeing "a great red bank of clay flanking a natural harbor basin." Early Baltimore Town settlers originally referred to this area as "John Smith’s Hill".

=== The Federalist ===
In May 1788, Baltimoreans paraded through the streets to celebrate the State of Maryland's ratification of the United States Constitution the seventh state of the first nine required out of the original Thirteen Colonies to do so. The parade featured a 15-foot scale model of a fully rigged sailing ship named the Federalist led by then young naval hero Joshua Barney that was to be installed atop John Smith's Hill. The day turned into quite a celebration; the thousands of celebrants were treated to "untold quantities" of grog, toddy, beef, ham, and cheese, financed by leading Baltimore business scions. Revelers were having so much fun that they opted to slide the Federalist down the hill and launch it from "The Basin" (today"s Inner Harbor) to be sailed later down the Chesapeake Bay to the state capital at Annapolis, following then up the Potomac River to be presented to retired Continental Army General George Washington at his riverfront Mount Vernon estate plantation. This celebration was so legendary that Baltimoreans renamed ‘John Smith’s Hill’ in tribute to the party boat. Hence the origin of the Park's name: "Federal Hill".

=== Observatory ===
Federal Hill's views were first put to commercial use in 1795 when, in cooperation with the Maritime Exchange, Captain David Porter established a "marine observatory" and signal tower on the site. The tower provided a panorama that stretched a good 15 miles or more down the Patapsco River. Spotting an incoming ship, the watchman would unfurl the observatory's "house flag" to alert the merchants and ship owners at the Maritime Exchange of an imminent arrival.

=== War of 1812 and the Battle of Baltimore ===
A military battery was built on Federal Hill in anticipation of an attack by sea from the British who had occupied, raided and terrorized the Chesapeake Bay region during 1813–1814, under notorious Rear Admiral George Cockburn. Although there was never an attack in the first year of the enemy campaign in 1813 with only some probings and soundings of the channel depths, finally on September 12, 1814, the vaunted Royal Navy fleet brought 3,000 British troops and supplies, landing southeast of the city at North Point and marched north and west up the Patapsco Neck peninsula to attack the city. That night, they reached Loudenschlager's and Potter Hills (later renamed Hampstead Hill in today's Patterson Park) on the east side of the town where 10,000 Americans from three surrounding states and an estimated 100 cannon /artillery pieces heavily dug in, under the leadership of Major General Samuel Smith of the Maryland Militia, blocked the invading army's path. Two statues in memory of two of the three major battle commanders (General Smith and Maj. George Armistead) commemorate this important victory adorn the north side slope of Federal Hill Park today. On the following day, September 13, British ships moved north up the Patapsco and began firing a two day long barrage of rockets, shells and bombs at Fort McHenry guarding the harbor at the tip of the Whetstone Point peninsula; Major George Armistead and 1,000 patriot defenders retaliated with their cannons, when the British ships sailed within range. Realizing their attack on the city had failed, the British sailed down river to North Point to pick up their retreating soldiers. The Battle of Baltimore was over. The memorials to Smith and Armistead and their brave troops now occupies the northeast corner of Federal Hill Park, as it has since 1885 with the Armistead statue, with the Smith sculpture moved here in the early 1970s.

=== Civil War and Fort Federal Hill ===
The hill gained notoriety during the Civil War (1861–1865) when Federal Hill was once again converted to military use in as the 6th Massachusetts Militia and elements of Cook's Light Artillery of Boston occupied Federal Hill under the command of General Benjamin F. Butler. In May 1861, against Washington's orders, Butler and his men erected a small fort, with numerous cannon pointing towards the central business district across the Basin. Their goal was to guarantee the allegiance of the city and the state of Maryland, whose loyalty to the North was in some doubt. The Union finally encircled the existing military installation with a wall and for the duration of the Civil War, the property was referred to as Fort Federal Hill. A large flag, a few cannon, and a small Grand Army of the Republic for Civil War veterans monument remain to testify to this period of the hill's history.

=== 19th and 20th century ===
For much of the 19th century, the Federal Hill shore shared with Fell's Point the city's thriving shipping trade and related industries. Federal Hill itself was mined for sand for a nearby glassworks, leaving behind some caverns which exist to this day and are a favorite subject of legends. Modern Federal Hill was born in the 1960s, when a few hardy pioneers bought and began renovating homes in what had become a forgotten neighborhood. Federal Hill was threatened in the mid-60 by plans for an interstate highway. Residents rebelled, joined hands across the harbor, and eventually quashed the plans.

The rebuilding of the Inner Harbor area in the late 70s and early 80s greatly increased interest in Federal Hill as an enclave of intimate residential streets within minutes of the city's business and entertainment heart. Due to the traffic and development, particularly at the foot of the Hill along Key Highway and Covington Street, the Hill has collapsed at least twice during the last 10 years, requiring the city to fund major reconstructive efforts to preserve Federal Hill Park.

One refurbishment project was completed in 1995 and in 2000, the park was rededicated after a nearly $2 million stabilization project to combat an erosion problem.

=== Present day ===
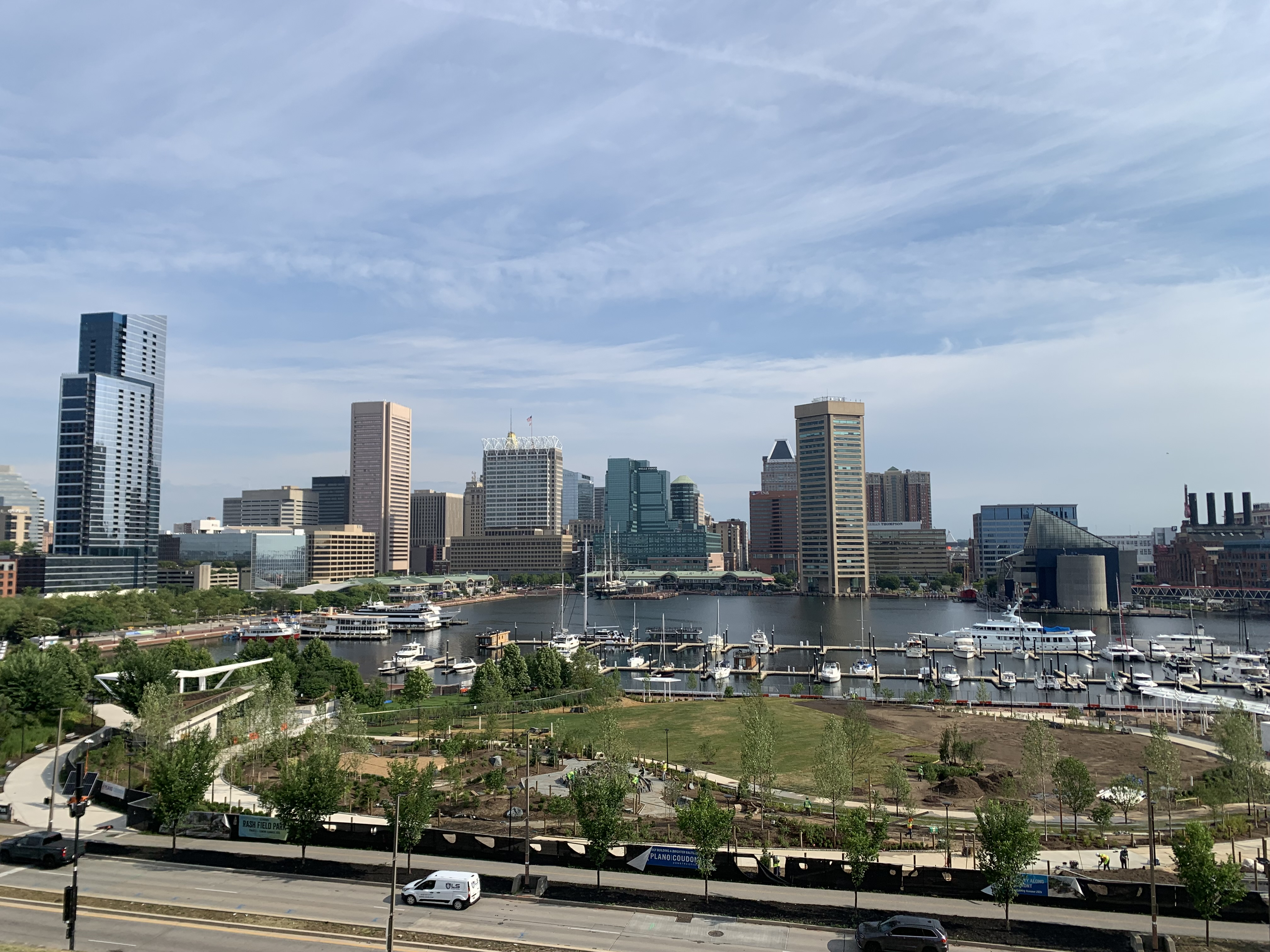
View of Baltimore's Inner Harbor from Federal Hill

Today, Federal Hill Park offers one of the most prominent views of the Inner Harbor and downtown Baltimore. The "great red bank of clay" is now a green hillside with lawns used for picnicking and other passive recreation. Monuments commemorating history enhance the Park, cannons that once manned at Fort Federal Hill during the Civil War are featured, as well, embellishing the promenade that overlooks the downtown cityscape. Bikers, hikers and parents behind strollers are common in the park.

== Recreation ==
At the foot of Federal Hill Park lie recreational features such as a basketball court (recently renovated by Baltimore-based Under Armour sportswear) and Rash Field, containing a variety of events and activities including beach volleyball and a gated kids playground area.
