= Hilton Baltimore Inner Harbor =

Hotel located on West Pratt Street in Baltimore, Maryland, US

Coordinates: 39°17′8.3″N 76°37′16.9″W

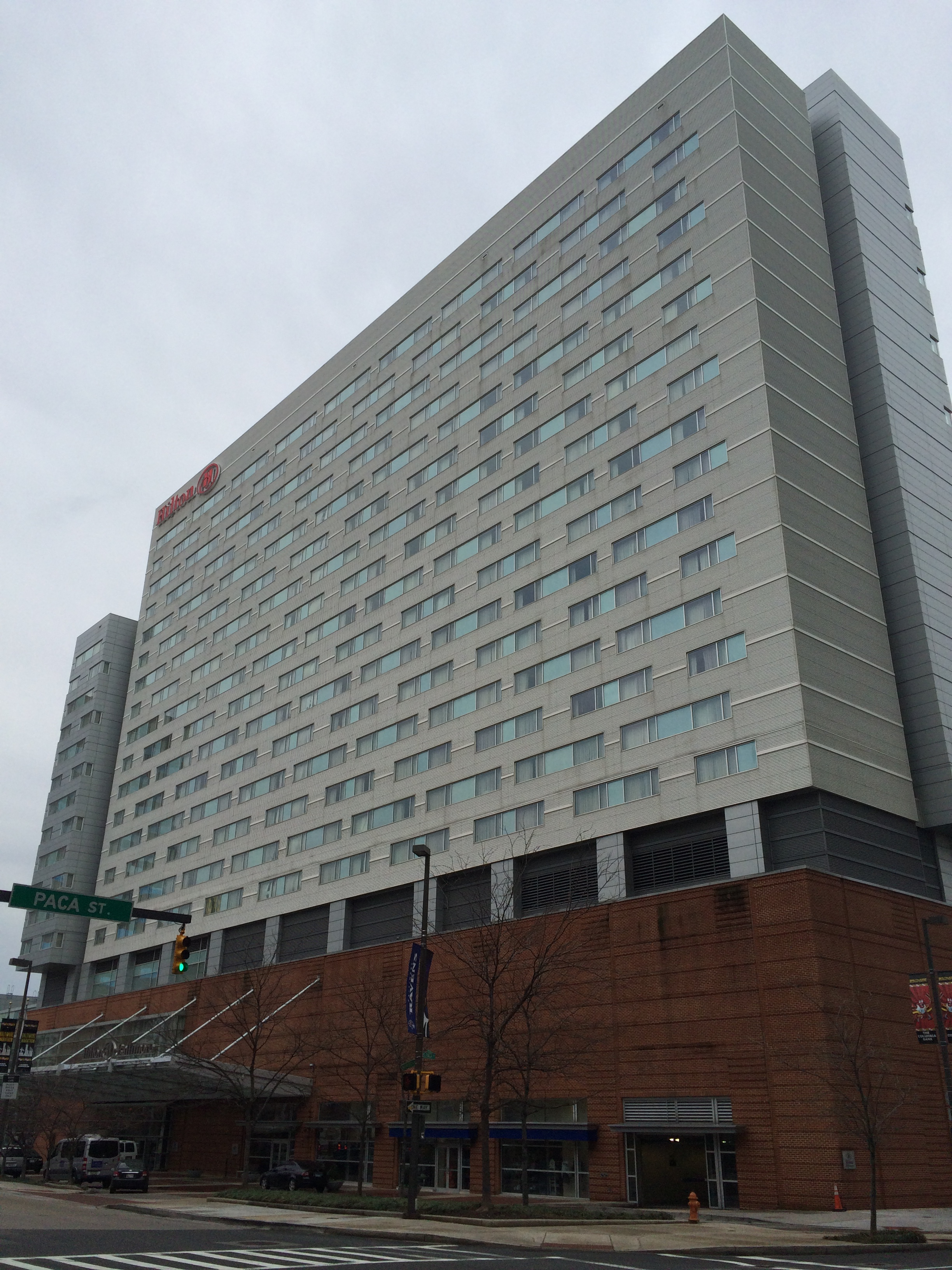
The Hilton Baltimore, seen from the corner of Pratt and Paca Streets

The Hilton Baltimore Inner Harbor, is a 757–room hotel located on West Pratt Street in Baltimore, Maryland, United States. Initially proposed in 2003, actual construction of the city-owned venture took place between 2006 and 2008 as part of the Baltimore Convention Center. A month before the hotel's scheduled opening in August 2008, Baltimore Mayor Sheila Dixon said that an 18% increase in room night bookings through 2017, as of the fiscal year ending June 30, 2008, compared to the previous year's, confirmed the city's decision to move forward with the hotel development project as a means of bolstering Baltimore's convention business. The massive hotel has been criticized for blocking the once-celebrated views of Baltimore's skyline from the Oriole Park at Camden Yards grandstand, however. The hotel underperformed projections, losing money in its first three years of operation.

== History ==
=== 2003 ===
The Baltimore Sun reported on April 10, 2003, that three proposals were submitted to the Baltimore Development Corporation:

- A 755-room Westin hotel with 600 parking spaces and 54,457 sq ft (5,000 sq meters) of meeting and ballroom space. The proposal was submitted by Garfield Traub Development LLC, a Dallas-based real estate developer that has built convention hotels, and Baltimore-based development firm Otis Warren & Co.

The group also proposed developing the hotel along with a new 19,000-seat arena, offices and the headquarters for Catholic Relief Services, which has asked the city to use the parcel for its new offices.

The proposal would be paid for with tax-exempt bonds that require public ownership of the hotel.

- An 869-room hotel with 592 parking spaces, 55,000 sq ft (5,100 sq meters) of meeting and ballroom space, a 36,000 square foot (3,300 m²) soundstage and recording studio, as well as a wellness clinic and spa.

The plan was presented by Atlanta-based Portman Holdings LP, one of the nation's largest developers of convention hotels. The team also includes Treyball Development Inc., a company based in Beverly Hills, Calif., that is owned by the actor Will Smith and his brother, Harry. No brand name was included in the proposal.

The project would be paid for with private financing, tax-increment financing, which dedicates future tax receipts to the development, or through sale of tax-exempt bonds, depending on the city's preference.

- The Hilton proposal by Johnson's firm, the Bethesda-based RLJ Development LLC, and Quadrangle. The developers also would build the 200,000 square foot (19,000 m²) headquarters for Catholic Relief Services on the grounds. No financing method was identified.

The RLJ proposal also included 1,000 parking spaces and 75,000 sq ft (7,000 sq meters) of meeting and ballroom space. A second phase would add 400 hotel rooms and a 200,000 sq ft (19,000 m^{2}) hotel-office-residential building.

On October 24, 2003, the Baltimore Development Corporation chose the 750-room Hilton Hotel RLJ proposal, announcing that the hotel will have 1,000 underground parking spaces and will have a 20,000 sq ft (2,000 sq meters) grand ballroom and nearly 62,000 sq ft (6,000 sq meters) of meeting space that can be utilized by the Baltimore Convention Center. The hotel is going to be about 24 stories high and cost approximately $200 million to build and will have shops and restaurants that will be designed to function with Oriole Park at Camden Yards during the Baltimore Orioles' home games. The hotel will be built on two vacant blocks that are north of Oriole Park at Camden Yards and west of the Baltimore Convention Center where currently a parking lot is located and the hotel will have an all-weather walkway connected to the Baltimore Convention Center.

Critics at the time questioned whether the property would be better suited for possible future expansion of the Baltimore Convention Center. Also debated was whether 750 rooms is sufficient to help attract more business to the Baltimore Convention Center.

On November 13, the Baltimore Sun said that Mayor Martin O' Malley approved the 750-room Hilton Hotel RLJ proposal, granting RLJ Development a six-month exclusive negotiating priority to build the $200 million hotel, subject to negotiation of financing and room blocking for convention business. The city was reported to be desirous of minimizing the project's financial impact on Baltimore taxpayers. The Baltimore Area Convention and Visitors Association (BACVA) was said to want 60% of the 750 rooms would be available to BACVA at any given time. The proposal offered 600 rooms available to BACVA, with a final decision to be made between the Hilton and the city when the hotel nears opening. O'Malley projected the hotel to bring in $4.4 million yearly with taxes and other revenue and provide 461 jobs by the fourth year of operation.

On November 24, the Baltimore Sun said that development officials of Baltimore City will be requesting an estimated $290 million for the hotel project, making it one of Baltimore City's costliest public works project in its history, and that City of Baltimore will also set up a non-profit organization to develop, own, and operate the hotel.

=== 2005 ===
Legislation was introduced in the Baltimore City Council for insurance of $305 million in city revenue bonds for the project. On May 6, 2005, the Baltimore Planning Commission unanimously approved bills to create a property tax district for the hotel project, along with authorization of the revenue bond sales for the hotel project, and approval of street closures for the hotel's construction. The Baltimore Sun said that the hotel will be connected to the Baltimore Convention Center via a second-story skywalk and that the Baltimore Area Convention & Visitors Association's statistics showed that the lack of a convention center hotel caused Baltimore to lose approximately 120,000 room bookings, approximating $100 million in lost revenue, in the past three years.

On June 23, the Baltimore Sun reported that the hotel project was met with skepticism by the Baltimore City Council, with many Council members questioning the need for the hotel project and the necessity for it to be publicly financed. On July 11, the Baltimore City Council delayed a vote on the hotel project because only three out of the fifteen city council members supported the project, eight members were either opposing it or leaning towards opposing it, and three were undecided. The Sun said the two major objections voiced by city council members is that development officials had not tried hard enough to find a private developer and whether Baltimore needed a convention center hotel. The Baltimore Development Corporation and Baltimore Mayor Martin J. O'Malley said the city needed the 752 room Hilton to remain competitive in the convention industry and that the Baltimore Development Corporation could not secure a private investor on terms more favorable than the proposal for the publicly financed project submitted to the city council for approval. Some on the city council said that public financing would enable Baltimore to share in the profits that the hotel would generate and if it was privately funded, the city would not receive anything.

The City Council also considered amendments regarding minimum wages for hotel workers and also subject the hotel's board to Maryland's "open meetings" law.

On August 15 the Baltimore City Council approved the Convention Center Hotel bill by a 9 to 6 vote, supported by then-City Council President Sheila Dixon, Vice President Stephanie C. Rawlings Blake, Paula Johnson Branch, Robert W. Curran, Kenneth N. Harris Sr., Helen L. Holton, Edward L. Reisinger, Rochelle "Rikki" Spector and Agnes Welch. Opponents of the measure were Mary Pat Clarke, Belinda Conaway, Nicholas C. D'Adamo Jr., James B. Kraft, Keiffer J. Mitchell, Jr. and Bernard C. "Jack" Young. A second, largely formal 9-5 final vote approving the hotel project occurred on September 19.

=== 2006 ===
Ground was broken for the hotel's construction on February 17, 2006. The targeted completion date was June 30, 2008.

=== 2008 ===
With substantial completion of construction in 2008, there were complaints that views of the city's skyline are now blocked from most sections of Oriole Park at Camden Yard's grandstand. The Baltimore Sun said on April 21, 2008, "There's just a glimpse of the Bromo Seltzer Tower's crenellated top just to the right of the new Hilton Baltimore Convention Center hotel ... something's drastically different at Oriole Park this year ... the sweeping view of downtown Baltimore that fans have enjoyed for the past 16 seasons has changed considerably..." Sportswriter Peter Schmuck complained, "the big, antiseptic convention hotel ... looms over Camden Yards ... [and] has blocked out the best part of the Baltimore skyline". A Washington Post columnist called it a "cruel cubist joke on a previously perfect ballpark", although others said they were pleased with new construction downtown as indicative of urban revitalization.

Baltimore Mayor Sheila Dixon said at a July 18 news conference that an 18% increase in room night bookings in Baltimore's hotels through 2017, as of the fiscal year ending June 30, 2008, compared to the previous year's, confirmed the city's decision to move forward with the hotel development project as a means of bolstering Baltimore's convention business.

=== 2010 ===
The hotel lost money for the third consecutive year.

=== 2011 ===
Due to continued difficulty in attracting conventions to Baltimore, the Greater Baltimore Committee proposed spending approximately $450 million more for a convention center expansion.

=== 2024 ===
On September 2, 2024, The Hilton Baltimore was the site of the first hotel worker strike in 54 years. Members of the Unite Here Local 7 went on a one-day Labor Day strike for better pay and better working conditions. A new four year labor contract calling for significant wage increases and increased funding for the pension and health care plans of Hilton Baltimore employees would later be ratified on October 22, 2024. Collective bargaining for a new contract would then end on October 27, 2024 when Hilton Baltimore employees would again approve the now ratified contract. Despite bearing the Hilton name, the Hilton Baltimore remains owned by the city of Baltimore. It has also been reported that in spite of the October 2024 labor contract, issues plaguing the Hilton Baltimore would remain ongoing.
