= MAA (singer) =

- Also known as: Mar
- Born: Maria; January 25, 1986 (age 40); Yokosuka, Kanagawa, Japan
- Genres: Synthpop; dance-pop; pop
- Occupations: Singer; lyricist; TV host; model
- Instrument: Vocals
- Years active: 2006–present
- Labels: Exit Line; Warner Music
- Website: tntc-maa.syncl.jp

MAA is a Japanese recording artist, former TV host and model. Previously known as Mar (stylized as MAR), she was vocalist of the alternative rock band Marbell from 2006 to 2010. When they disbanded she embarked on a solo career, switching to pop music.

== History ==
MAA was born on January 25, 1986, in Yokosuka, Kanagawa to a Japanese mother and an American father. She started as a model and later became a host for a TV show called Visual Shock. Through this job she met fashion designer H. Naoto (who would later design the clothes and outfits for Marbell).

=== 2006–2010: Marbell ===
In 2006, she, going by the name Mar, and Tsunoda Takanori formed the alternative rock band Marbell. They were later joined by bassist Azusa and drummer yu-ya before releasing their debut album Sister on May 14, 2008. The band toured throughout Japan, mainly performing live in Tokyo, but also performed at the 2008 Otakon convention in the United States. Four of the songs from their album were performed by the band on May 3, 2008, at the first day of the hide memorial summit, which gave Marbell the opportunity to play for a huge audience at Ajinomoto Stadium. However, the band was inactive throughout 2009 and on March 10, 2010, it was officially announced that Marbell had disbanded after only four years together.

=== 2010–present: Solo ===
Only six months later Mar debuted as a solo artist, under the name MAA, with the single "Ghost Enemy". The EP Monkey Kingdom was released on December 1, 2010, and reached number 158 on the Oricon chart. On July 21, 2011, her third single "OKay" was released and became the ending song for NTV's Happy Music. She released her first full-length album BubbleMan Engine on October 12.

== Discography ==
Albums and EPs

- Monkey Kingdom (2010.12.01) – Oricon Albums Chart Peak Position: #158
- BubbleMan Engine (2011.10.12)

Singles

- "Ghost Enemy" (2010.09.22)
- "Ballerina Brain System" (バレリーナ・ブレインシステム; 2010.11.18)
- "OKay" (2011.07.20) – used as the ending theme song for NTV's Happy Music
- "Feel It!/Blue (Earth)" (Feel It!/ブルー(地球); January 23, 2013) – both used as theme songs for the pachinko games based on Tetsuo Hara's manga Cyber Blue

Other contributions

- "Fake Emotion feat. MAA" – on The Lowbrows' album Emotion (2010.11.24)
- "Ballerina Brain System -Michitomo Remix-" – on the compilation -D&N 10th Anniversary- Soul Works presents Gossip (2010.12.15)
- "Come Again" – on m-flo Tribute: Stitch the Future and Past (2011.04.20)
- "Tomorrow @ Your Kingdom" – on Celebrity presents Diary (2011.04.30)

With Marbell

- Sister (2008.05.14)
