= Otakon =

Annual anime convention in Washington, D.C., US

Coordinates: 39.28538°N 76.61734°W

- Otakon 2020 logo

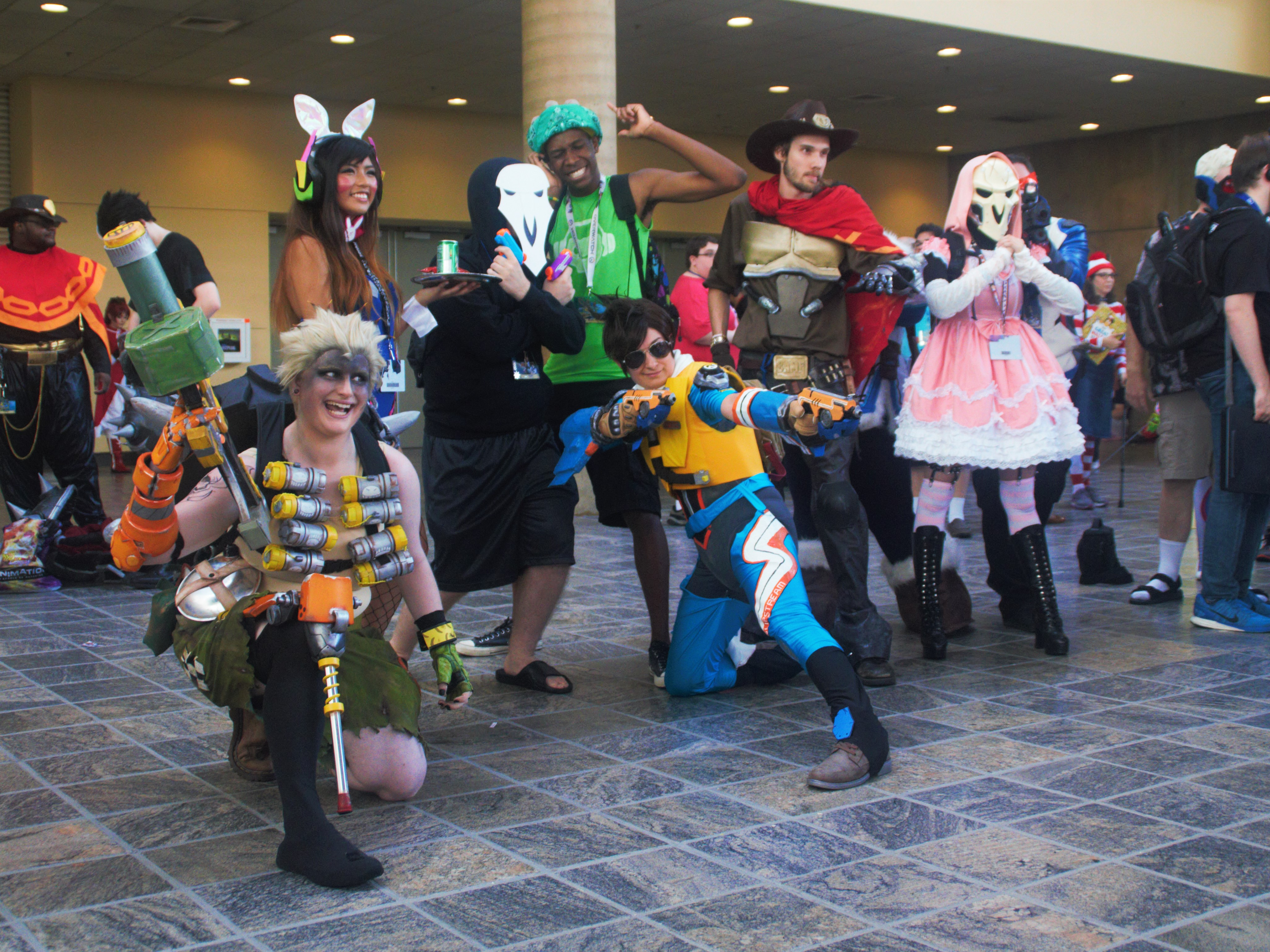
- Cosplayers at Otakon 2016
- Status: Active
- Genre: Anime, East Asian popular culture
- Venue: Walter E. Washington Convention Center
- Location: Washington, D.C.
- Country: United States
- Inaugurated: July 29, 1994; 32 years ago
- Attendance: 47,049 in 2026
- Organizer: Otakorp, Inc.
- Filing status: 501(c)(3)
- Website: Otakon.com

Otakon (/ˈoʊtəkɒn/ OH-tə-kon) is an annual three-day anime convention held during July/August. From 1994 to 2016, it took place at the Baltimore Convention Center in Baltimore, Maryland's Inner Harbor district; in 2017, it moved to the Walter E. Washington Convention Center in Washington, D.C. The convention focuses on East Asian popular culture (primarily anime, manga, music, and cinema) and its fandom. The name is a portmanteau derived from convention and the Japanese word otaku.

== Otakorp ==
Otakon is run by the Pennsylvania-based non-profit organization Otakorp, Inc. whose primary purpose "is to promote the appreciation of Asian culture, primarily through its media and entertainment".

== Programming ==
Typical Otakon programming includes anime and live action East Asian films shown on big screens in multiple video rooms. Fan-produced content including fan-parodies and anime music videos (AMVs) are also shown. For several years, Otakon had a dedicated 35 mm film theater, but replaced it in 2008 with an HD theater to take advantage of the wider array of offerings in that format. Panels and workshops are held on subjects such as voice acting, how to draw manga, and Japanese culture. Industry professionals announce new acquisitions, and expert guests discuss or show tricks of their trade and field questions from the audience. Many panels and workshops are conducted by fans rather than pros (ex. Create a Comic Project). The convention also includes cosplay and a skit-based Masquerade show, which in the years before the convention moved to Washington D.C. had taken place inside the Royal Farms Arena.

== History ==
Otakon 2020 was cancelled due to its venue, the Walter E. Washington Convention Center, being converted to a field hospital to treat COVID-19 patients during the ongoing pandemic.

=== Event history ===
Dates	Location	Attendance (unique memberships)	Guests	Notes
July 29–31, 1994	Days Inn Penn State, State College, Pennsylvania	350	Robert DeJesus, David Fleming, Jei Fubler Harvey, Bill Mayo, Neil Nadelman, Steve Pearl, Lorraine Savage, Sue Shambaugh, and Jeff Thompson.	
September 1–4, 1995	Penn State Scanticon, State College, Pennsylvania	450	Steve Bennett, Robert DeJesus, Matt Greenfield, Teruo Kakuta, Trish Ledoux, Neil Nadelman, Toshio Okada, Steve Pearl, C. Scott Rider, Tomoko Saito, Lorraine Savage, Sue Shambaugh, Toren Smith, John Staton, Jeff Thompson, Adam Warren, and Robert Woodhead.	Otakon's first and only four day convention
August 9–11, 1996	Marriott's Hunt Valley Inn, Hunt Valley, Maryland	1,000	Steve Bennett, Robert DeJesus, Masaomi Kanzaki, Matt Lunsford, Neil Nadelman, Steve Pearl, Sue Shambaugh, Jeff Thompson, and Adam Warren.	
August 8–10, 1997	Marriott's Hunt Valley Inn, Hunt Valley, Maryland	1,750	Ippongi Bang, Kuni Kimura, Matt Lunsford, and Jan Scott-Frazier.	
August 7–9, 1998	Hyatt Regency-Crystal City, Arlington, Virginia	2,500	Hiroshi Aro, Juliet Cesario, Robert DeJesus, Tiffany Grant, Scott Houle, Shoji Kawamori, Kuni Kimura, Trish Ledoux, Stuart Levy, Matt Lunsford, Tristan MacAvery, Neil Nadelman, Lisa Ortiz, Steve Pearl, Jan Scott-Frazier, Scott Simpson, John Staton, Jeff Thompson, and Amanda Winn-Lee.	
July 2–4, 1999	Baltimore Convention Center, Baltimore, Maryland	4,500	Steve Bennett, Chris Beveridge, Michael Brady, Robert DeJesus, Robert Fenelon, Crispin Freeman, Tiffany Grant, Amy Howard-Wilson, Mari Iijima, Mitsuhisa Ishikawa, Yoko Kanno, Kuni Kimura, Hiroyuki Kitakubo, Shin Kurokawa, Rachael Lillis, Neil Nadelman, Kazuto Nakazawa, Lisa Ortiz, Steve Pearl, Fred Perry, Frederik L. Schodt, Jan Scott-Frazier, John Staton, Jeff Thompson, Adam Warren, and Shinichiro Watanabe.	
August 4–6, 2000	Baltimore Convention Center, Baltimore, Maryland	7,500	Yoshitoshi ABe, Bôa, Steve Bennett, Chris Beveridge, Mandy Bonhomme, Robert Fenelon, Michael Granberry, Shinya Hasegawa, Scott Houle, Amy Howard-Wilson, Kunihiko Ikuhara, Mitsuhisa Ishikawa, Ian Kim, Neil Nadelman, Steve Pearl, Gilles Poitras, Hiroaki Sakurai, Jan Scott-Frazier, John Staton, Jeff Thompson, Yasuyuki Ueda, Adam Warren, Pamela Weidner, and Simon Yam.	
August 10–12, 2001	Baltimore Convention Center, Baltimore, Maryland	10,275	Steve Bennett, Rodney "Largo" Caston, Jo Chen, Colleen Doran, Fred Gallagher, Tiffany Grant, Scott Houle, Toshihiro Kawamoto, Ian Kim, Shin Kurokawa, Masao Maruyama, Hikaru Midorikawa, Fred Perry, Gilles Poitras, Jan Scott-Frazier, Kazuya Tsurumaki, Adam Warren, and Pamela Weidner.	
July 26–28, 2002	Baltimore Convention Center, Baltimore, Maryland	12,880	Steve Bennett, Chris Beveridge, Rodney "Largo" Caston, Fred Gallagher, Yoko Ishida, Wendee Lee, Masao Maruyama, Yutaka Minowa, Kiroyuki Morioka, Neil Nadelman, Yasuhiro Nightow, Fred Perry, Gilles Poitras, Tatsuo Sato, Jan Scott-Frazier, and Lianne Sentar.	
August 8–10, 2003	Baltimore Convention Center, Baltimore, Maryland	17,338	Steve Bennett, Mandy Bonhomme, Johnny Yong Bosch, Justin Cook, Julie Davis, Robert DeJesus, Brian Drummond, Fred Gallagher, Scott Houle, Yoshiaki Iwasaki, Toshihiro Kawamoto, Itsuro Kawasaki, Tsukasa Kotobuki, Pontus Madsen, Masao Maruyama, Rica Matsumoto, Dr. Susan Napier, Satoshi Nishimura, Kristine Sa, Frederik L. Schodt, Jan Scott-Frazier, T.M.Revolution, and Pamela Weidner.	Otakon's 10th anniversary
July 30 – August 1, 2004	Baltimore Convention Center, Baltimore, Maryland	20,899	Angela, Matt Boyd, Siu-Tung "Tony" Ching, Luci Christian, Koge Donbo*, Richard Epcar, Christian Fundin, Mohammad "Hawk" Haque, Chuck Huber, L'Arc-en-Ciel, Pontus Madsen, Ian McConville, Yutaka Minowa, Ichiro Okouchi, Ananth Panagariya, Chris Patton, Monica Rial, Christopher Sabat, Tatsuo Sato, Yuzo Sato, Lianne Sentar, and Matt Thorn.	
August 19–21, 2005	Baltimore Convention Center, Baltimore, Maryland	22,000	Greg Ayres, Katie Bair, Matt Boyd, Brian Carroll, Luci Christian, Justin Cook, Richard Ian Cox, Huw "Lem" Davies, Ben Dunn, Christian Fundin, Fred Gallagher, Michael Gluck, Mohammad "Hawk" Haque, the Indigo, Yoshinori Kanemori, Kumiko Kato, Toshihiro Kawamoto, Dave Lister, Pontus Madsen, Masao Maruyama, Ian McConville, Mike McFarland, Mary Elizabeth McGlynn, Scott McNeil, Vic Mignogna, Mitsukazu Mihara, Seiji Mizushima, Ananth Panagariya, Fred Perry, Puffy AmiYumi, Scott Ramsoomair, Xero Reynolds, Monica Rial, Michelle Ruff, Michael "Mookie" Terracciano, and Toshifumi Yoshida.	Attendance was capped at 22,000; attendance cap was reached on Saturday, August 20.
August 4–6, 2006	Baltimore Convention Center, Baltimore, Maryland	22,302	Christine Auten, Troy Baker, Colleen Clinkenbeard, Christian Fundin, Lisa Furukawa, Fred Gallagher, Caitlin Glass, Kate Higgins, Kouta Hirano, Hirotsugu Kawasaki, Ayako Kawasumi, Nana Kitade, Yuri Lowenthal, Pontus Madsen, Masao Maruyama, Mike McFarland, Mucc, Kazuto Nakazawa, Monica Rial, Antimere Robinson, Patrick Seitz, Makoto Tateno, Yoshiki Hayashi, and Nobuteru Yuuki.	Attendance was capped at 25,000; attendance cap was not reached.
July 20–22, 2007	Baltimore Convention Center, Baltimore, Maryland	22,852	AAA (Attack All Around), Morio Asaka, Steve Blum, Colleen Clinkenbeard, Aaron Dismuke, Eminence, Christian Fundin, Fred Gallagher, Caitlin Glass, Ryuhei Kitamura, Kenji Kodama, Pontus Madsen, Vic Mignogna, Maki Murakami, Mamiko Noto, Hitoshi Sakimoto, Tomokazu Seki, Stephanie Sheh, Michael Sinterniklaas, Michihiko Suwa, and Steve Yun.	
August 8–10, 2008	Baltimore Convention Center, Baltimore, Maryland	26,262	Laura Bailey, Peter S. Beagle, DaizyStripper, Richard Epcar, Peter Fernandez, Taliesin Jaffe, JAM Project, Willow Johnson, Kyoko Kano, Mika Kano, Mela Lee, Yuri Lowenthal, MarBell, Masao Maruyama, Hiromi Matsushita, Tony Oliver, Tara Platt, Derek Stephen Prince, Michael Sinterniklaas, Ellyn Stern, Kazuko Tadano, The Underneath, and Kappei Yamaguchi.	
July 17–19, 2009	Baltimore Convention Center, Baltimore, Maryland	26,586	Becca, Crispin Freeman, Kikuko Inoue, Noboru Ishiguro, Yukio Kikukawa, Masao Maruyama, Hidenori Matsubara, Mike McFarland, Mary Elizabeth McGlynn, MELL, Misako Rocks!, Tony Oliver, Frederik L. Schodt, Naomi Tamura, VAMPS, Kanon Wakeshima, Travis Willingham, and Yutaka Yamamoto.	
July 30-August 1, 2010	Baltimore Convention Center, Baltimore, Maryland	29,274	Peter S. Beagle, Chris Bevins, Maile Flanagan, Scott Freeman, Todd Haberkorn, Clarine Harp, Naoto Hirooka, Home Made Kazoku, Amy Howard-Wilson, Masashi Ishihama, Jerry Jewell, Kanon, Hiroki Kikuta, Hiroshi Koujina, Masao Maruyama, Koji Masunari, Vic Mignogna, Yuji Mitsuya, Shihori Nakane, Tomonori Ochikoshi, Takamasa Sakurai, Patrick Seitz, Stephanie Sheh, Michael Sinterniklaas, Felipe Smith, Sugizo, J. Michael Tatum, The Yoshida Brothers, Yoshiki Hayashi, and Hiroaki Yura.	
July 29–31, 2011	Baltimore Convention Center, Baltimore, Maryland	29,337	Peter S. Beagle, Johnny Yong Bosch, Chemistry, Eyeshine, Scott Freeman, Toshihiro Fukuoka, Orine Fukushima, Noboru Ishiguro, Atsuhiro Iwakami, Masumi Kano, Roland Kelts, Kylee, Shelby Lindley, Masao Maruyama, Mitsuba, Cassandra Lee Morris, Kazuya Murata, Momoka Ohara, Tony Oliver, Lisa Ortiz, Masayuki Ozaki, Scott Sager, Takamasa Sakurai, DJ Saolilith, Akira Sasanuma, Patrick Seitz, Stephanie Sheh, Chiaki Shimogama, Makoto Shinkai, Bob Shirohata, Sixh., Synergy, J. Michael Tatum, Nobuo Uematsu, Cristina Vee, Tom Wayland, Mari Yoshida, and Hiroaki Yura.	
July 27–29, 2012	Baltimore Convention Center, Baltimore, Maryland	30,785	Peter S. Beagle, Christine Marie Cabanos, Jason David Frank, Gashicon, Aya Hirano, Mikako Joho, Tetsuya Kakihara, Lauren Landa, Masao Maruyama, Yuuka Nanri, Trina Nishimura, Ai Nonaka, Brina Palencia, Shin Sasaki, Michael Sinterniklaas, J. Michael Tatum, Hidetaka Tenjin, Gen Urobuchi, VIXX, and Sarah Anne Williams.	
August 9–11, 2013	Baltimore Convention Center, Baltimore, Maryland	34,211	Shingo Adachi, Peter S. Beagle, Maile Flanagan, Crispin Freeman, Tsukasa Fushimi, Todd Haberkorn, Kyle Hebert, Home Made Kazoku, Chiaki Ishikawa, Hiroyuki Kanbe, Yoko Kanno, Tetsuya Kawakami, Roland Kelts, Kaoru Kurosaki, Masao Maruyama, Mike McFarland, Vic Mignogna, Kazuma Miki, Masayuki Ozaki, Takamasa Sakurai, Jad Saxton, Tomokazu Seki, Micah Solusod, Michihiko Suwa, T.M.Revolution, Yuzuru Tachikawa, Cristina Vee and, Shinichiro Watanabe.	Otakon's 20th anniversary
August 8–10, 2014	Baltimore Convention Center, Baltimore, Maryland	33,929	Altima, Linda Ballantyne, Dante Basco, Peter S. Beagle, Christine Marie Cabanos, Robbie Daymond, Kelly Gneiting, Katie Griffin, Saori Hayami, Jiro Ishii, Shinichiro Kashiwada, Sunao Katabuchi, Carrie Keranen, Yusuke Kozaki, Wendee Lee, Masao Maruyama, Hidenori Matsubara, Erica Mendez, Tony Oliver, Stephanie Sheh, John Stocker, Ray Villard, David Vincent, Yama, Yoshiki Hayashi, and Hiroaki Yura.	Attendance was capped at 35,000; attendance cap was not reached. First time in Otakon's history that an attendance decline occurred.
July 24–26, 2015	Baltimore Convention Center, Baltimore, Maryland	26,877	Ei Aoki, Laura Bailey, Sandy Fox, Yuichiro Hayashi, Yasuaki Iwase, Seiji Kishi, Toru Kubo, Shizuka Kurosaki, Lauren Landa, Lex Lang, Masao Maruyama, Toshiyuki Nagano, Oreskaband, Bryce Papenbrook, Romi Park, Christopher Sabat, Takamasa Sakurai, Sean Schemmel, Shinji Takamatsu, Kaiji Tang, J. Michael Tatum, Toshiyuki Toyonaga, Travis Willingham, Shuko Yokoyama, and Draft King.	Attendance was capped at 35,000; attendance cap was not reached. Second consecutive attendance decline recorded.
August 12–14, 2016	Baltimore Convention Center, Baltimore, Maryland	29,113	Zach Aguilar, Kazuki Akane, Ilya Alekseyev, All Off, Ray Chase, Robbie Daymond, Aaron Dismuke, Shiro Dogu, Kasumi Fukagawa, Caitlin Glass, Kazuki Higashiji, Kenji Horikawa, Kuniko Kanawa, Yoshitaka Kawaguchi, Nobuhiro Kikuchi, Erik Scott Kimerer, Lauren Landa, Michael Liscio Jr., Yui Makino, Michi, Jason Charles Miller, Max Mittelman, Koji Morimoto, Sarah Natochenny, Muneki Ogasawara, Lisa Ortiz, Haven Paschall, Alyson Leigh Rosenfeld, Stephanie Sheh, Michael Sinterniklaas, Matt Stagmer, Sonny Strait, LeSean Thomas, Alexis Tipton, Shunsuke Wada, Kazutomi Yamamoto, and Yoshiki Hayashi.	Last year Otakon was held in Baltimore. Attendance increased by 9.3% after two consecutive years of decreasing attendance.
August 11–13, 2017	Walter E. Washington Convention Center, Washington, D.C.	24,894	Ilya Alekseyev, Ei Aoki, Stella Chuu, Flow, Sandy Fox, Toshio Furukawa, Kyle Hebert, JAM Project, Shino Kakinuma, Kuniko Kanawa, Roland Kelts, Tetsuya Kinoshita, Tomoki Kyoda, Lex Lang, Masao Maruyama, Hidenori Matsubara, Takanori Matsuoka, Jamie McGonnigal, Vic Mignogna, Chris Niosi, Tony Oliver, Project BECK, Tyson Rinehart, Michelle Ruff, Frederik L. Schodt, Stephanie Sheh, Michael Sinterniklaas, The Slants, Matt Stagmer, Katsuyuki Sumizawa, T.M.Revolution, Hideyuki Tomioka, and Shimba Tsuchiya. (Note: Flow, JAM Project, and T.M.Revolution appeared as part of the Anisong World Matsuri event.)	First year Otakon was held at the Walter E. Washington Convention Center in Washington, D.C. Attendance decreased 14.4%.
August 10–12, 2018	Walter E. Washington Convention Center, Washington D.C.	28,116	Ollie Barder, Johnny Yong Bosch, Nobutoshi Canna, Ray Chase, SungWon Cho, Mr. Creepy Pasta, Robbie Daymond, Lucien Dodge, Kanetake Ebikawa, Jessie James Grelle, Todd Haberkorn, Kuniko Kanawa, Soojin Kang, Shoji Kawamori, Hirokatsu Kihara, Young Sun Kim, Yasutaka Kimura, Cherami Leigh, Masaya Matsukaze, Yuji Matsukura, Kyle McCarley, Erica Mendez, Max Mittelman, Tatsuyuki Nagai, Masahiko Otsuka, Bryce Papenbrook, Sujin Ri, Arnie Roth, Jez Roth, Naoko Tsutsumi, Nobuo Uematsu, Ho San Yi, Toshifumi Yoshida, and Yoh Yoshinari.	Attendance rebounded almost to 2016's level, increasing by 13.14%
July 26–28, 2019	Walter E. Washington Convention Center, Washington D.C.	28,430	Ilya Alekseyev, Steve Bennett, Jen Cohn, Richard Epcar, Makoto Furukawa, Toru Furuya, Diana Garnet, Erika Harlacher, Hiroyuki Imaishi, Kikuko Inoue, Hirokatsu Kihara, Shigeto Koyama, E. Jason Liebrecht, Masao Maruyama, Elizabeth Maxwell, Hiroshi Nagahama, Atsushi Nakayama, Nano, Stephanie Panisello, Jez Roth, Shing02, Matt Stagmer, Ellyn Stern, Substantial, Michihiko Suwa, Kirk Thornton, Kaoru Wada, Kari Wahlgren, Hiromi Wakabayashi, Yoshihiro Watanabe, and BRADIO.	
August 1, 2020	Online convention			
August 6–8, 2021	Walter E. Washington Convention Center, Washington D.C.	25,564	Zach Aguilar, Ricco Fajardo, Aleks Le, Adam McArthur, Laura Post, Kaiji Tang, Abby Trott, Anne Yatco, Suzie Yeung, Joe Zieja, and Conisch. (Note: Norihiro Kurosawa, Hiroshi Watanabe, Conisch and Atsushi Kosaka appeared in a livestreamed Hetalia World Stars panel and Q&A event.)	Idol group SPARK SPEAKER was scheduled to appear, but cancelled when the group disbanded in May 2021.
July 29–31, 2022	Walter E. Washington Convention Center, Washington D.C.	40,466	AleXa, Celeina Ann, Beau Billingslea, Steve Blum, Tiana Camacho, Jose Estrada, Ricco Fajardo, Angelina Foss, Lai Frances, Harumi Fujita, Toshio Furukawa, G.L.A.M.S, Yuki Hayashi, Motonobu Hori, Chado Horii, Mariya Ise, Takahiro Izutani, Shino Kakinuma, Masazumi Kato, Hiroyuki Kikukawa, Junhong Kim, KingChris, Masafumi Mikami, Pixy, Kiral Poon, Zeno Robinson, Rolling Quartz, Kaho Shibuya, Kaoru Wada, Hiromi Wakabayashi, Yoshihiro Watanabe, Wataru Watari, Yoh Yoshinari, and Jenny Zha.	Attendance rose by 57% from 2021, breaking the previous all-time record set by 2013's Otakon. Factors including relaxed travel restrictions allowing Japanese guests to return, the burgeoning popularity of Korean music in the U.S. at the time, and the option given to AnimeNEXT members to roll 2022 memberships over into Otakon memberships after the public attractions of AnimeNEXT 2022 were called off, lead to Otakon's highest attendance numbers ever.
July 28–30, 2023	Walter E. Washington Convention Center, Washington D.C.	42,101	Shinji Aramaki, Kia Asamiya, Ollie Barder, Mario Castañeda, Justin Cook, Jose Estrada, Ricco Fajardo, Haruna Ikezawa, Junko Iwao, Shoji Kawamori, KingChris, Amanda "AmaLee" Lee, Brandon McInnis, Masahiko Otsuka, Takaharu Ozaki, Kaho Shibuya, Megan Shipman, Substantial, Super Art Fight, J. Michael Tatum, Hidetaka Tenjin, Natalie Van Sistine, Yoshihiro Watanabe, Wataru Watari, and Yuji Yanase.	
August 2–4, 2024	Walter E. Washington Convention Center, Washington D.C.	46,000 (est.)	Britt Baron, John Bentley, Jonathan Case, Ricco Fajardo, Christophe Ferreira, Flow, Diana Garnet, Haenuli, Yuki Hayashi, Hideo Ishikawa, Erica Lindbeck, Brandon McInnis, Max Mittelman, Hiroshi Nagahama, Masahiko Otsuka, Nozomi Shimakura , Ben Starr, Substantial, J. Michael Tatum, Koki Uchiyama, Kaoru Wada, Yoshihiro Watanabe, Scott Westerfeld, Briana White, and Suzie Yeung.	Otakon's 30th Anniversary
August 8–10, 2025	Walter E. Washington Convention Center, Washington D.C.	About 43,000	Babybeard, Nobutoshi Canna, Allegra Clark, Haenuli, Kohei Hattori, Xanthe Huynh, Hylian Cream, Hiroshi Kamiya, Christina Marie Kelly, Katsuyuki Konishi, Hidenori Matsubara, MindaRyn, Sarah Myer, Koutaro Nishiyama, Non Sweet, Hiroaki Sakurai, Sushio, Sora Tokui, Kari Wahlgren, Hiromi Wakabayashi, and Yoshihiro Watanabe.	
July 31-August 2, 2026	Walter E. Washington Convention Center, Washington D.C.	47,049	Kengo Abe, Ryo Ariyama, Chika Ayamori, Ray Chase, Kazuki Chiba, Jordan Dash Cruz, Kenya Danino, Hayden Daviau, Trina Deuhart, Toh EnJoe, Michael-Christopher Koji Fox, Ayaka Fukuhara, Takayuki Goto, Kazuki Higashiji, Xanthe Huynh, Yuka Iguchi, Ironmouse, Yoshiaki Iwasaki, Nobuharu Kamanaka, Ryo Kamito, Ichigo Kanno, Crystal Lee, Courtney Lin, Machico, Yuji Matsukura, Takanori Matsuoka, Yoshitsugu Matsuoka, Masahiko Minami, Moe↗Age!, Cassandra Lee Morris, Toshio Murouchi, Sarah Myer, Ayaka Nanase, Yuna Nemoto, Kenji Nojima, Yuya Ogisu, Kunio Oka, Ryotaro Okiayu, Rumi Okubo, Teruyuki Omine, Alejandro Saab, Shogo Sakata, Mitsuru Sangou, Masako Sato, Nozomi Shimakura, Sam Slade,Maki Terashima-Furuta, Yuji Tokuno, Tonpeties, Shimba Tsuchiya, Yoko Ueda, Kazuki Ura, Hiromi Wakabayashi, Tetsuaki Watanabe, Yoshihiro Watanabe, Yuki Watanabe, Yuji Yanase, Takayuki Yoneyama, Goshi Yoshida, and Keita Yoshinobu.	
August 6-8, 2027	Walter E. Washington Convention Center, Washington D.C.			

=== Locations ===
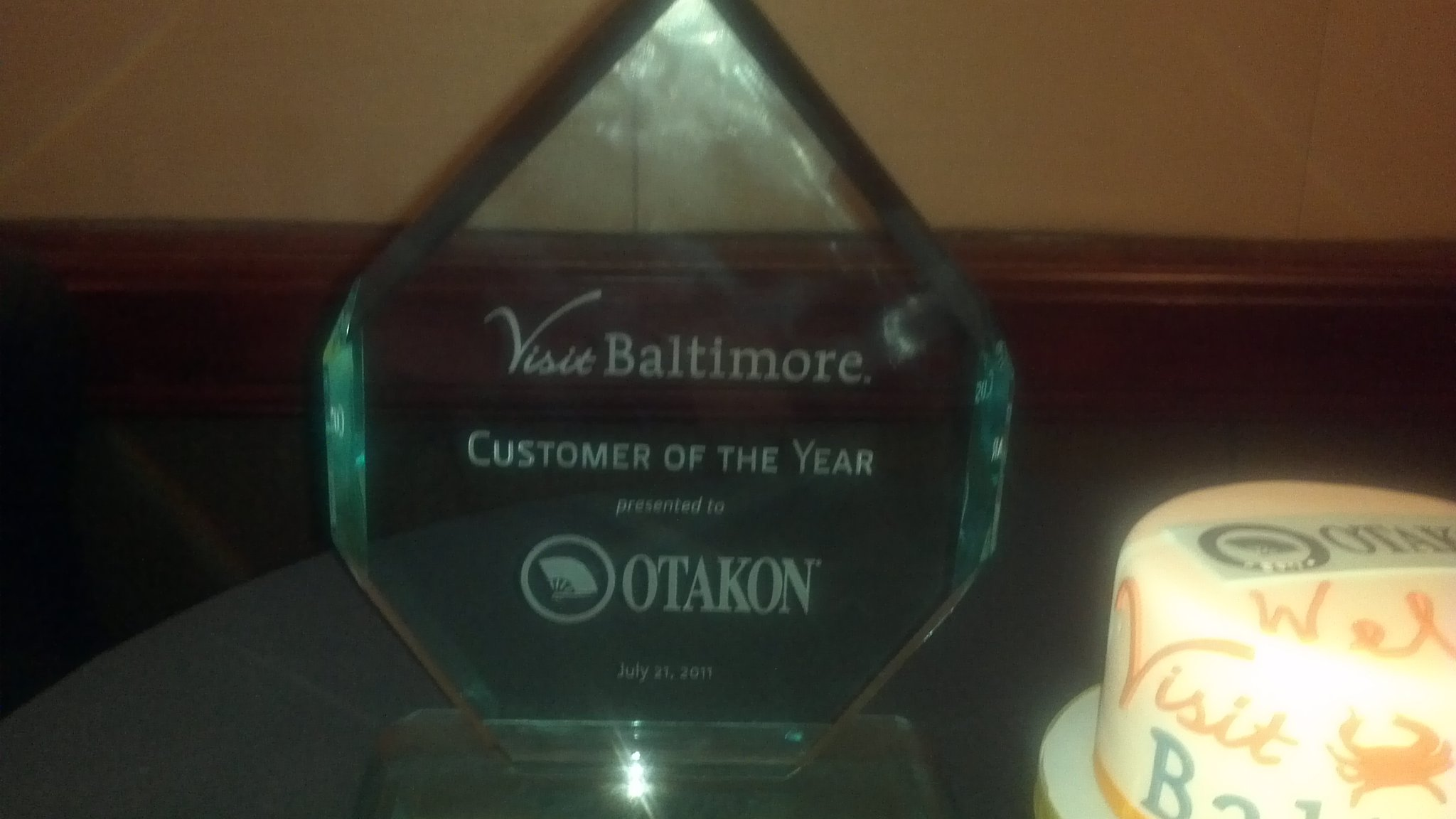
Otakon 2011 Visit Baltimore "Customer of the Year" Award

The first Otakon was held at a Days Inn in State College, Pennsylvania in 1994; 350 people attended.

==== Baltimore ====
From 1999 to 2016, Otakon was held at the Baltimore Convention Center in Baltimore, Maryland. In 2011, the Baltimore city tourism agency, Visit Baltimore, gave Otakon a "Customer of the Year" award for "demonstrat[ing] ongoing commitment to Baltimore, bringing more than 27,000 attendees to the city every year, a much-anticipated event by the local community and media". Otakon has been a top convention for Baltimore since 2003. Otakon 2009 had an economic impact of $12.5 million in direct spending and booked over 4,500 hotel rooms. According to the Baltimore Business Journal on December 10, 2010, Otakon 2010 had 4,575 booked hotel rooms and an estimated economic impact of $15.3 million, up from $12.5 million the year before; in particular it had significant impact on food vendors.

==== Washington, DC ====
Beginning in 2017, Otakon moved to Washington, DC, to the Walter E. Washington Convention Center.

==== Las Vegas ====
From 2014 to 2018, a spin-off convention also run by Otakorp had been held in January at the Planet Hollywood Resort and Casino in Las Vegas, Nevada. In 2018, shortly after the end of Otakon Vegas 2018, Otakorp, Inc. announced on the Otakon Vegas website that Otakon Vegas was going on hiatus for an undetermined amount of time and that Otakon Vegas 2018 would be the last Otakon Vegas held. Otakorp, Inc. described Otakon Vegas as being an "experiment" and stated that they were "taking some time to examine the results of this experiment, to rethink and reorganize the show logistics, and to determine how best to bring the show forward." They left the door open for a future Otakon Vegas by concluding that they "hope to return to Vegas in the future.""
