= Marbell =

Japanese rock band

MarBell
- MarBell performing in Tokyo, 2008.

Background information
- Origin: Tokyo, Japan
- Genres: Alternative rock; shoegazing; gothic rock
- Years active: 2006–2010
- Label: N-Records
- Past members: Mar; Tsunoda Takanori; Azusa; yu-ya
- Website: www.marbell.jp

Marbell (stylized as MarBell) was a Japanese rock band active from 2006 to 2010 and signed to their own independent label, N-Records. The band's clothes and outfits were all designed by famed fashion designer H. Naoto.

== History ==
Marbell was formed in 2006 with half-Japanese half-American model Mar on vocals and Tsunoda Takanori as guitarist, producer and arranger. They were later joined by bassist Azusa and drummer yu-ya before releasing their debut album, Sister, on May 14, 2008. The band toured throughout Japan, mainly performing live in Tokyo, but also performed at the 2008 Otakon convention in the United States. Four of the songs from their album were performed by the band on May 3, 2008, on the first day of the hide memorial summit, which gave Marbell the opportunity to play for a huge audience at Ajinomoto Stadium and to honor hide, whom Tsunoda was greatly inspired by. The band was inactive throughout 2009.

On March 10, 2010, it was officially announced that Marbell had disbanded after only four years together. Vocalist Mar has since begun a solo career under the name MAA.

== Members ==
- Mar – vocals (2006–2010)
- Tsunoda Takanori – guitar, producer (2006–2010)
- Azusa – bass (2008–2010)
- yu-ya – drums (2008–2010)

== Discography ==
- Sister (2008)
