= Baltimore Convention Center =

Convention center in Baltimore, Maryland

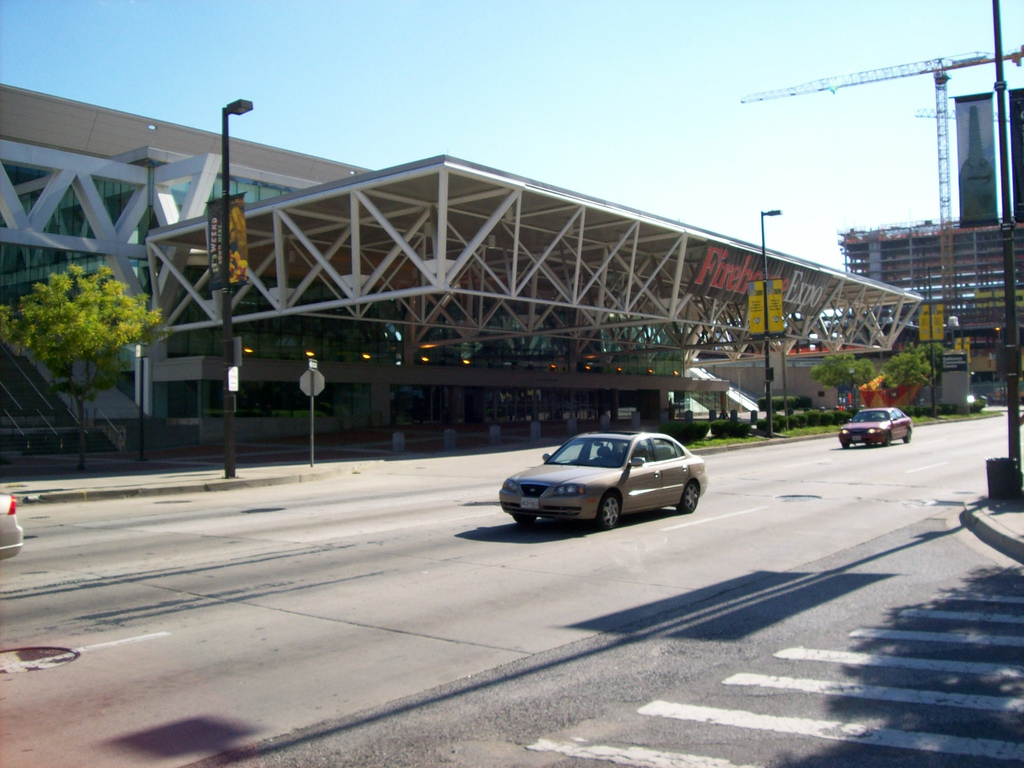
- View from Pratt Street, 2007
- Interactive map of Baltimore Convention Center
- Address: 1 West Pratt Street
- Location: Baltimore, Maryland
- Coordinates: 39.28538°N 76.61734°W
- Owner: The City of Baltimore
- Public transit: Convention Center

Construction
- Built: 1977–1978 (?)
- Opened: 1979
- Renovated: 1996 (1979 wing)
- Expanded: 1996
- Cost: $200 million

Website
- www.bccenter.org

The Baltimore Convention Center is a convention and exhibition hall located in downtown Baltimore, Maryland. The center is a municipal building owned and operated by the City of Baltimore.

The facility was constructed in two separate phases: the original center, with 425,000 square feet (39,500 m^{2}) of exhibition and meeting space, opened in August 1979 at a cost of $51.4 million. A $151 million expansion, which increased the center's total size to 1,225,000 square feet (113,800 m^{2}) was completed in April 1997. The 752-room, city-owned Hilton Baltimore hotel opened in August 2008, connected to the convention center by an enclosed skywalk bridge.

In March 2016, the State of Maryland announced it was going to explore expanding the Baltimore Convention Center for an estimated cost of $600 million and build a new hotel attached to the expansion. As of August 2016, the proposal also included building a new arena. On February 4, 2020, it was reported by the Baltimore Business Journal that the proposed expansion will not occur as a revised cost estimate for just expanding the convention center is more than $1.5 billion so the proposal has been scaled back significantly to only modernize the convention center, not expand it as previously proposed.

As of 2024, an expansion for the Baltimore Convention Center is back on the table and a state-level task force was formed to study the Baltimore Convention Center and the tourism industry of Baltimore City and a final report was released which made three recommendations with regards to the future of the Baltimore Convention Center and the city's tourism industry. (See the Future subsection "Baltimore Convention Center Modernization and Expansion Project (2024-Present.)" for more information on this current effort.)

== History ==
As was the case with Harborplace, which opened in 1980; the Maryland Science Center, which opened in 1976; and the National Aquarium in Baltimore, which opened in 1981, the Convention Center was intended to be a catalyst for tourism, an important part of the city's post-manufacturing economic development plans. An Abell Foundation report in June 2005 describes the Convention Center as having been "built as an economic development tool to attract to Baltimore conventions, trade shows, and meetings that would leave in the city millions of dollars spent on lodging, food, entertainment, and other services." (Controversy, 2005, p. 3) A report on economic development in the area, entitled Subsidizing the Low Road: Economic Development in Baltimore, states that "public and non-profit facilities such as the Maryland Science Center, the World Trade Center, the Convention Center, and the National Aquarium" (Subsidizing, 2002, p. 11) were part of then-mayor Schaefer's "focus on real estate, retailing and tourism sectors" (p. 10), as areas for growth, as well as his utilization of "'public/private partnerships' to pursue economic development" (p. 11).

During the next two decades, due in part to the success of the Convention Center and the other attractions, Oriole Park at Camden Yards, Sports Legends Museum at Camden Yards, M&T Bank Stadium, Power Plant Live!, and the Reginald F. Lewis Museum of Maryland African-American History, have joined the area, creating a ten-block plus entertainment and cultural destination at Baltimore's Inner Harbor, further increasing tourist dollars flowing into the region.

A June 2005 Greater Baltimore Committee report on tourism in Baltimore illustrates the importance of tourism in the current Baltimore region's economy:

Hospitality and tourism and the convention industry are vital components of the region's economy. According to the Baltimore Area Convention and Visitors Association (BACVA), spending from domestic travelers in 2002 was $8.476 billion statewide; $2.8 billion in Baltimore alone. This spending supported $719 million in state and local taxes while providing over 44,000 regional jobs. (Voices, 2005)

One major convention held in the convention center was Otakon, a convention that focuses on anime and other facets of East Asian culture. The convention had resided in the Baltimore Convention Center between 1999 and 2016. In 2013, the convention attracted 34,211 people. However, organizers of that convention announced at the close of the 2013 event plans to move to the Walter E. Washington Convention Center in Washington, D.C., for at least five years starting in 2017. Convention officials cited space concerns, along with the uncertainty of construction plans for the convention center and a new arena. According to WBAL-TV, Baltimore's local NBC news affiliate, due to the pending departure of Otakon in 2017 to Washington, D.C., concerns were mounting regarding Baltimore's economic future when it came to tourism. In 2016, Otakon's final year in Baltimore, 29,113 people attended, a decline from its peak attendance of 34,211 in 2013.

The Convention Center is also viewed as important to the recent development on Baltimore's West Side. According to Ronald M. Kreitner, executive director of West Side Renaissance Inc., the "Convention Center will help contribute to the success of the theaters and the retail," referring to the development of the France-Merrick Performing Arts Center/Hippodrome Theatre, as well as new retail ventures in the area. (Renaissance, 2003)

By 2013, the center was playing a major role in the city's tourism growth, with conventions, seminars, conferences and exhibitions helping boost visitor numbers that year to 23.9 million, and expenditure by visitors to $5.15 billion. Visit Baltimore President Tom Noonan noted in July 2014 Baltimore was leading other cities in terms of future convention center bookings, through until 2021.

In early 2017, a Baltimore Sun article revealed that Otakon wasn't the only large convention that Baltimore City lost due to the current size of the Baltimore Convention Center. The article reports that as of the fiscal year that ended on June 30, 2016, Visit Baltimore hosted 415 total events with a combined estimated economic impact of $180 million, the city usually hosts 20 to 30 large conventions annually however city officials are now stating the convention center is too small to be competitive with other cities. The article also reports that at least 10 large conventions have left Baltimore due to outgrowing the convention center and these conventions were held at the convention center during the previous 10 years and the total of 10 large conventions includes Otakon which as of 2017 will be held at the much larger Walter E. Washington Convention Center in Washington, D.C. The article also reports that future conventions are at risk of leaving Baltimore as well.

== Future ==
Despite the continuing growth and redevelopment in the area, the expanded Convention Center has not met expectations with respect to the number of conventions and people it attracts each year. Irene E. Van Sant, then-manager of the Convention Center Hotel Project for the Baltimore Development Corporation, Baltimore's former Mayor Sheila Dixon, and Governor of Maryland Martin O'Malley—feel that a hotel adjacent to the Convention Center will make it a more appealing site for conventions. The completion of the Walter E. Washington Convention Center in Washington, D.C., and the National Harbor project in Prince George's County intensified the debate.

In general, supporters of a convention hotel say that for the Convention Center to be viable in the future, and compete with other cities for conventions, a new "Headquarters" hotel is necessary to guarantee enough rooms for group meetings. Opponents of the hotel project have either questioned the necessity of a new hotel altogether or objected to the use of public dollars to finance the project. The Baltimore Convention Center hotel, named Hilton Baltimore, broke ground in February 2006 and opened in August 2008. It has 752 rooms and is the city's largest hotel, connected directly to the Convention Center via sky bridge. Baltimore City used public revenue bonds to cover the $301.7 million cost of building the hotel.

=== First proposed arena-hotel-convention center project (2010–2016) ===
When the 1996 expansion to the Baltimore Convention Center opened, the convention center was ranked 28th largest in the nation in terms of exhibition and meeting space. By 2011, the convention center plummeted to 73rd largest and, as a result, Baltimore is losing convention business. Visit Baltimore reports that the Hilton Baltimore Convention Center Hotel that opened in August 2008 is helping, but since the opening of the Hilton the city has lost over 700,000 hotel-night bookings due to the convention center being too small to meet the needs of a group or the dates the group wanted was not available.

It has been argued that if Baltimore does not expand its convention center, the city could "fall off the map as a potential convention choice." Nearby cities have or are in the process of expanding convention and hotel space, such as Washington D.C. (opened the Walter E. Washington Convention Center in 2003 with plans to open a 1,175-room Marriott Marquis hotel with 100,000 square feet (9,300 m^{2}) of convention and meeting space in 2013) and Philadelphia (expanded its Pennsylvania Convention Center in 2011 of over 700,000 square feet (65,000 m^{2}) of meeting and convention space).

Visit Baltimore proposes an expansion of the convention center, reasoning that it would allow the city to accommodate multiple large meetings or conventions at a time. Additionally, the Greater Baltimore Committee estimates that with the proposed arena-hotel-convention center, Baltimore could accommodate as many as 300 new convention groups that cannot utilize Baltimore currently due to the size of the convention center.

In fall 2010, the Greater Baltimore Committee, a local influential business group, proposed an estimated $900 million project that would demolish the 1979 wing of the Baltimore Convention Center east of Sharp Street, plus the Sheraton Inner Harbor Hotel on the same block, and replace the buildings with a four-story, 760,000 square feet (71,000 m^{2}) convention center expansion, an 18,500-seat arena that will replace Baltimore's existing 1st Mariner Arena over two levels of underground parking, a new 500-room Sheraton hotel and stores and restaurants facing Pratt, Charles and Conway Streets. At the time, the $900 million price tag was the only obstacle with the proposal.

However, on May 25, 2011, at the annual meeting for the Greater Baltimore Committee, the owner of the Sheraton Inner Harbor hotel, local business and construction magnate, Willard Hackerman, made an offer that he would be willing to finance more than half of the proposed $900 million price tag and would be willing to build the hotel and the arena which is estimated to cost $500 million and the remainder, $400 million for the convention center expansion would need to be financed by the State of Maryland and Baltimore City, the offer is contingent on whether the city and state can move the convention center expansion project forward. The offer received a positive reception from both Baltimore City Mayor Stephanie Rawlings-Blake and Maryland Governor Martin O'Malley who both have submitted requests to the Maryland Stadium Authority to conduct a feasibility study on the project that is due by the end of 2011.

Visit Baltimore, the architects involved and others have said that this project is unique in that no other cities in the nation would have a combination arena-hotel-convention center the size of the proposed project in Baltimore.

On June 2, 2011, The Baltimore Sun reported that Mayor Stephanie Rawlings-Blake and Governor Martin O'Malley wanted the Maryland Stadium Authority to pay for the estimated $150,000 feasibility study that will determine the "estimate of taxes that the project would generate" and if the study found the project to be viable, O'Malley and Rawlings-Blake wanted "an analysis of potential financing options and a strategy for moving the work forward." On June 14, 2011, the MSA unanimously approved the feasibility request with a 7–0 vote; however, the MSA wanted the city of Baltimore to pay for part of the $150,000 cost for the feasibility study.

On July 18, 2011, The Baltimore Sun reported that the Baltimore Convention & Tourism Board approved to take $50,000 out of Visit Baltimore's budget to pay for the $150,000 feasibility study that the Maryland Stadium Authority approved on June 14, 2011.

As of October 10, 2011, the Maryland Stadium Authority had posted on its website the feasibility study that was approved on June 14, 2011. The project is expected to include "a market and economic study of the convention center expansion and incremental tax benefits for all three venues, and a funding strategy." According to the MSA page, "The study is expected to be complete by winter [2011–2012]."

On March 5, 2012, the feasibility report was published and made public jointly by the Maryland Stadium Authority and Baltimore City which strongly makes the recommendation for expanding the Baltimore Convention Center and replacing 1st Mariner Arena, reiterating that Baltimore's tourism industry will be harmed in the long run if no action is taken. Also, on April 11, 2012, the Baltimore Business Journal published an article stating that the Maryland General Assembly approved $2.5 million for the convention center project allocated for "initial design [of the] $400 million expansion of the convention center (slated to be funded using public money from the State of Maryland and the City of Baltimore), as well as a $500 million, 18,500-seat arena and hotel project (slated to be funded using private funding from a group led by local business magnate Willard Hackerman)" however the Maryland General Assembly's budget committees added a prerequisite before they will approve the release of the $2.5 million. The prerequisite required that the State of Maryland, the City of Baltimore and the private financiers of the project submit a memorandum of understanding to the Maryland General Assembly's budget committees with a detailed explanation of how this project would be funded, how much of the $400 million would be shared between the State of Maryland and the City of Baltimore and exactly who would operate the new arena. The proponent of this project and CEO of the Greater Baltimore Committee, Donald Fry, stated in an interview with the Baltimore Business Journal that the approval of initial design funds by the Maryland General Assembly gives the green light to both the Greater Baltimore Committee and Willard Hackerman to enter into serious negotiations with private investors regarding "naming rights or concession agreements for the arena" and he feels that this is a good sign that the Maryland General Assembly will, in fact, provide even more state funding towards this project in the future.

On October 22, 2012, Tom Noonan, President and CEO of Visit Baltimore, voiced his support of this proposal. A series of studies would need to be conducted by the Maryland Stadium Authority to activate the $2.5 million and determine the feasibility and costs of the project. Construction, however, is not expected to begin until at least 2016.

In the Summer of 2013, the Greater Baltimore Committee proposal to build an expanded Baltimore Convention Center and a new arena came up in the Baltimore media due to the announcement that the largest event for Baltimore City, Otakon, would be departing Baltimore in 2017 to Washington, D.C., due to the convention quickly running out of room at the Baltimore Convention Center. According to The Baltimore Sun on August 11, 2013, the proposal "was not close to becoming a reality" and that according to GBC's spokesman Gene Bracken, financing for the proposal "hasn't been worked out at all." On August 16, 2013, The Baltimore Sun reported that little progress has been made on the Greater Baltimore Committee's proposal, reporting that since April 2012, city and state officials have been negotiating with Willard Hackerman regarding exactly how to pay for the total $900 million projected amount for the proposal and that if the city, state and Mr. Hackerman can come up with a funding plan, the state will release $2.5 million "to pay for an expanded study of the project." The Baltimore Sun in the same article reported that the uncertainty surrounding the proposal to expand the Baltimore Convention Center "played a part in Otakon's departure" where Visit Baltimore "warned" a bid evaluating team for future Otakons "that construction could affect those events" however Visit Baltimore's CEO, Tom Noonan told The Baltimore Sun that "there's no set plan and that we're not near that point" in regards to potential construction and that a future study "will be to figure out how" the Baltimore Convention Center will "operate during construction." On August 12, 2013 WBAL reported that Donald Fry of the Greater Baltimore Committee told WBAL that he hoped that the GBC would be able to "present the mayor with some sort of financial concept within the next 30 to 60 days."

On February 10, 2014, the Greater Baltimore Committee proposal to build an expanded convention Center and new arena hit a major roadblock: the owner of the Sheraton Inner Harbor and the person who was spearheading the efforts to raise private funds for the project, Willard Hackerman died. The Baltimore Business Journal reported on February 11, 2014, that the death of Willard Hackerman the day prior has thrown the future of the proposal into question. Kaliope Parthemos, Baltimore City's then-Deputy Mayor of Economic and Neighborhood Development told the Baltimore Business Journal that the City of Baltimore was in active discussions with Mr. Hackerman about the proposal up until December 2013 and stated that Mr. Hackerman was actively involved and wanted this proposal to move forward however he was "frustrated" that he could not have privately funded the entire cost by himself. Ms. Parthemos revealed that financing the estimated $900 million project "remained a significant hurdle up until Hackerman's death." Ms. Parthemos also stated that she was uncertain whether Mr. Hackerman made any plans to have the project continue after his death in case if he died.

As of November 27, 2015, no new news has been released regarding the uncertain future of the Greater Baltimore Committee proposal. It's currently unknown if the proposal will have political support after Martin O'Malley stepped down as Governor of Maryland due to term limits and Stephanie Rawlings-Blake announced she would not be seeking reelection as Baltimore Mayor.

As of March 8, 2016, this proposal is dead and not expected to be revived because the Rawlings-Blake administration is looking into renovating Royal Farms Arena instead of building a new arena. The State of Maryland has begun exploring the possibility of a $600 million expansion (see below).

=== Proposed $600 million Baltimore Convention Center Expansion and New Hotel (2016) ===
On March 8, 2016, it was revealed by the Baltimore Business Journal that the State of Maryland is exploring constructing a $600 million expansion to the Baltimore Convention Center that would double the existing floor space of the convention center and build a new hotel as well.

State officials are going to request in Spring 2016 from Governor Larry Hogan and the Maryland General Assembly $3 million in seed money to launch a study for expanding the convention center. This study will allow engineers and architects to figure out where to place the expansion.

Maryland's Commerce Secretary, Mike Gill said that the CEO of Visit Baltimore recently met with the Maryland Department of Commerce to request seed money to study the expansion of the convention center.

One possible location is demolishing the existing Sheraton Inner Harbor hotel and locating the expansion there and building the new hotel at the southwest corner of Pratt and Charles.

All of this is part of an ongoing discussion about expanding the Baltimore Convention Center which has been a focus of the current 2016 legislative session within the Maryland General Assembly.

This new proposal by the State of Maryland and the focus of expanding the Baltimore Convention Center within the Maryland General Assembly comes about in the final year [2016] that Baltimore's largest convention, Otakon, will be held in Baltimore. In 2017, Otakon will no longer be held in Baltimore and is relocating to Washington, D.C., at the larger Walter E. Washington Convention Center.

As of 12:00 AM EDT, April 12, 2016, the official end of the 2016 Maryland legislative session within the Maryland General Assembly, no bill was introduced in either the state Senate or House of Delegates that requested the $3 million in seed money to launch a study for expanding the Baltimore Convention Center. It's currently unknown why no bill was introduced in the 2016 legislative session when it was reported in March 2016 that there would be a request for $3 million, it's unknown if the request will be made within the 2017 Maryland legislative session that will begin on Wednesday, January 11, 2017, at 12:00 PM EST.

On Thursday, April 14, 2016, the Baltimore Business Journal reported that the $3 million for a study to expand the Baltimore Convention Center was supposed to be part of one of three supplemental budgets that the Maryland Governor has but according to Karen Glen Hood, a spokeswoman for the Maryland Department of Commerce told the Baltimore Business Journal that a formal request for $3 million was never submitted to Maryland Governor Larry Hogan and did not explain why the request was not made, instead deferring the question of why to local officials closer to the Baltimore Convention Center.

Visit Baltimore CEO Tom Noonan, a longtime advocate for expanding the Baltimore Convention Center stated he was "disappointed" that the funding wasn't in place at the end of the 2016 Maryland legislative session, the executive director of the convention center, Peggy Daidakis could not have been reached for comment.

Maryland's Secretary of Commerce, Mike Gill, told the Baltimore Business Journal that the interested parties in having the Baltimore Convention Center expanded are having "ongoing conversations" into what the next steps for a study would be but stated he couldn't state specifics.

Visit Baltimore's CEO Noonan revealed that at least 30% of interested citywide conventions, conventions defined as requiring at least 1,200 hotel rooms at its peak night, skip over Baltimore for other cities due to the convention center being either too small or is already booked on the dates the interested conventions want reserved in Baltimore.

The Baltimore Business Journal reports that when the Baltimore Convention Center opened in 1979, it was "one of the premier convention spaces in the country" but the stature of the convention center has fallen over time with upgrades to other convention centers in cities such as Philadelphia, Washington, D.C., and Atlanta.

Now, as of April 14, 2016, the interested parties for an expanded convention center will either have to wait until 2017's legislative session or search for alternative funding.

As of August 2, 2016, the proposed project of constructing an expanded convention center attached to a new arena and hotel has been revived and a $1 million feasibility study has in fact been approved (see below).

=== Second proposed arena-hotel-convention center project (2016–2017) ===
On August 2, 2016, it was revealed that the proposed project of constructing a combined expanded convention center attached to an arena and hotel has been revived and that a $1 million feasibility study for a combined arena, hotel and expanded convention center was requested by Baltimore Mayor Stephanie Rawlings-Blake from the Maryland Stadium Authority and that the Maryland Stadium Authority has approved the study. Funding is coming from the Maryland Stadium Authority ($126,667), the State of Maryland (an additional $500,000 is available immediately to fund this study), the Downtown Partnership of Baltimore ($30,000), the Greater Baltimore Committee ($30,000), and the City of Baltimore ($313,333). The study will take approximately a year to complete and is expected to be completed and released in Fall 2017. The study will look at having either just a convention center expansion and having a combined expanded convention center attached to a new arena and hotel, the study will look at the environmental, community and traffic impacts of the two proposals and what types of events the new facility will be able to attract, this study will also determine exactly how large the expanded convention center is supposed to be. The new complex will be bounded by Pratt, Charles and Conway Streets. This study will not include construction and budget plans as this is just Phase 1, if the state and city elects to move forward after reviewing the results of this study, that second study will put together just partial plans to obtain a cost estimate.

In November 2016, the Maryland Stadium Authority's feasibility study that was approved in August 2016 got full funding after the Baltimore City Board of Estimates approved to commit to $313,000 of funding towards the $1 million feasibility study. This comes approximately a week after the Baltimore Development Corp., the city's economic development agency's board approved to commit to $250,000 of funding towards the $1 million feasibility study (the remainder of the study costs are being funded through the state and two private groups: $126,667 from the Maryland Stadium Authority, $500,000 from the Maryland Department of Commerce with a total of $626,667 coming from the State of Maryland and $30,000 each from local groups the Downtown Partnership of Baltimore and the Greater Baltimore Committee). Jeff Pilas, the CFO of the Baltimore Development Corp. told the Baltimore Business Journal that if the study recommends an expansion to the Baltimore Convention Center, a second phase for the study would commence involving design. The study was requested by Baltimore Mayor Stephanie Rawlings-Blake and is expected to begin sometime in early 2017 and final completion is expected to be sometime later in 2017.

In April 2017, Baltimore Mayor Catherine Pugh, the successor to former Baltimore Mayor Stephanie Rawlings-Blake, stated that she does not agree with building a hotel as part of an expansion to the Baltimore Convention Center.

On May 4, 2017, The Baltimore Sun reported that Phase 1 of the Baltimore Convention Center expansion feasibility study is moving along. On May 3, 2017, the Maryland Stadium Authority approved a team for the study that includes Baltimore design firm Ayers Saint Gross, Seattle architectural firm LMN Architects, Kansas City firm Populous, and New York design firm Perkins Eastman. The Baltimore Sun reports that the study amount has significantly decreased from the amount being "up to $1 million" to now the study total costs is "not to exceed $460,000." The study is to "assess what combination of elements is feasible—a convention center expansion, hotel and new venue to replace Royal Farms Arena—and how they might fit together." and is expected to be completed by the end of 2017. Funding for the $460,000 is still coming from public and private sources including Baltimore City and the State of Maryland. Based upon the final recommendations of this study, The Baltimore Sun reports that a Phase 2 study "may be authorized later."

As of September 2017, Phase 1 of the Baltimore Convention Center expansion study is underway. According to an LMN Architects press release, the study will be examining 4 "alternative development options":

- An expanded and renovated Baltimore Convention Center without a hotel and new arena
- An expanded and renovated Baltimore Convention Center that incorporates only a new arena.
- An expanded and renovated Baltimore Convention Center that incorporates only a hotel.
- An expanded and renovated Baltimore Convention Center that incorporates both a hotel and a new arena.

The Baltimore Business Journal reported that the amount allocated to Phase 1 is indeed $1 million and a recommendation from this study is expected by the end of 2017.

The official study summary according to the Maryland Stadium Authority is:

MSA's Board has approved a request by the Mayor of Baltimore to conduct various program and construction related analysis to determine the program and technical feasibility for a proposed Baltimore Convention Center expansion. The Study will consider both a stand-alone convention center as well as a hybrid facility inclusive of a hotel and/or arena.

Funding is being provided by a mix of public, private, City and State dollars.

The MSA also lists the budget to be $1 million.

As of February 26, 2018, the Phase 1 feasibility study has not been released publicly yet nor has a study recommendation been released publicly, both were reported to be released by the end of 2017 and it's unknown what is causing the delay for releasing the Phase 1 study or the study recommendation.

=== Baltimore Convention Center Expansion/Renovation and Second Convention Center Hotel Project (2018-2020) ===
On July 6, 2018, Phase 1 of a feasibility study to examine the feasibility of expanding and renovating the Baltimore Convention Center along with a new convention center hotel and arena was released in three parts by the Maryland Stadium Authority. Phase 1 came to the ultimate conclusion that an expansion to the Baltimore Convention Center is financially and operationally feasible. The proposed scenario for the expansion is to demolish the 1979 half of the convention center located at the corner of West Pratt and South Charles Streets and demolish the Sheraton Inner Harbor hotel at the 300 block of South Charles Street and use that space to build an expansion connected to a second convention center hotel and also to fully renovate the 1996 half. An arena was determined to have "significant operational and construction challenges" so the arena is no longer a part of the project. The Mayor of Baltimore City, Catherine Pugh, requested in July 2018 that the Maryland Stadium Authority begin Phase 2 of the feasibility study. The MSA begun Phase 2 in Fall 2018 and is expected to be completed by Spring 2019. In the 2019 legislative session, the Maryland Senate introduced Senate Bill 799 and the Maryland House of Delegates has introduced a corresponding bill, House Bill 801 which would provide financing towards the construction of the project, $600 million total has been allocated towards the project in SB 799 and HB 801.

As of the end of the 2019 Maryland General Assembly legislative session, Maryland House Bill 801 passed both chambers and was enacted into law without Hogan's signature. The final law that was enacted as Chapter 695 removed the proposed $600 million allocated for construction of the expansion and renovation, it changed the defined boundaries of the convention center site to include the Sheraton Inner Harbor hotel and the adjacent parking garage located next to the hotel and the law requires that planning and design to begin during Fiscal Year 2020 which starts July 1, 2019, and that financing for the planning and design stage to be split between the state (2/3 of the final cost) and the City of Baltimore (remaining 1/3 of the final cost).

As of June 16, 2019, Phase 2 of the feasibility study has not been publicly released, the public release is unknown at the current time.

On February 4, 2020, the Baltimore Business Journal has reported that a revised cost estimate was released for just expanding the convention center and it is much more than the previously reported estimate of $600 million. The revised cost estimate is "more than $1.5 billion," according to the Maryland Stadium Authority, the revised cost estimate included land acquisition of the Sheraton Inner Harbor hotel and related infrastructure work of expanding the convention center and relocating infrastructure located in the southbound lane of Charles Street. As a result, the proposal is going to be scaled back significantly and an expansion is no longer being proposed.

=== Baltimore Convention Center Modernization Project (2020) ===
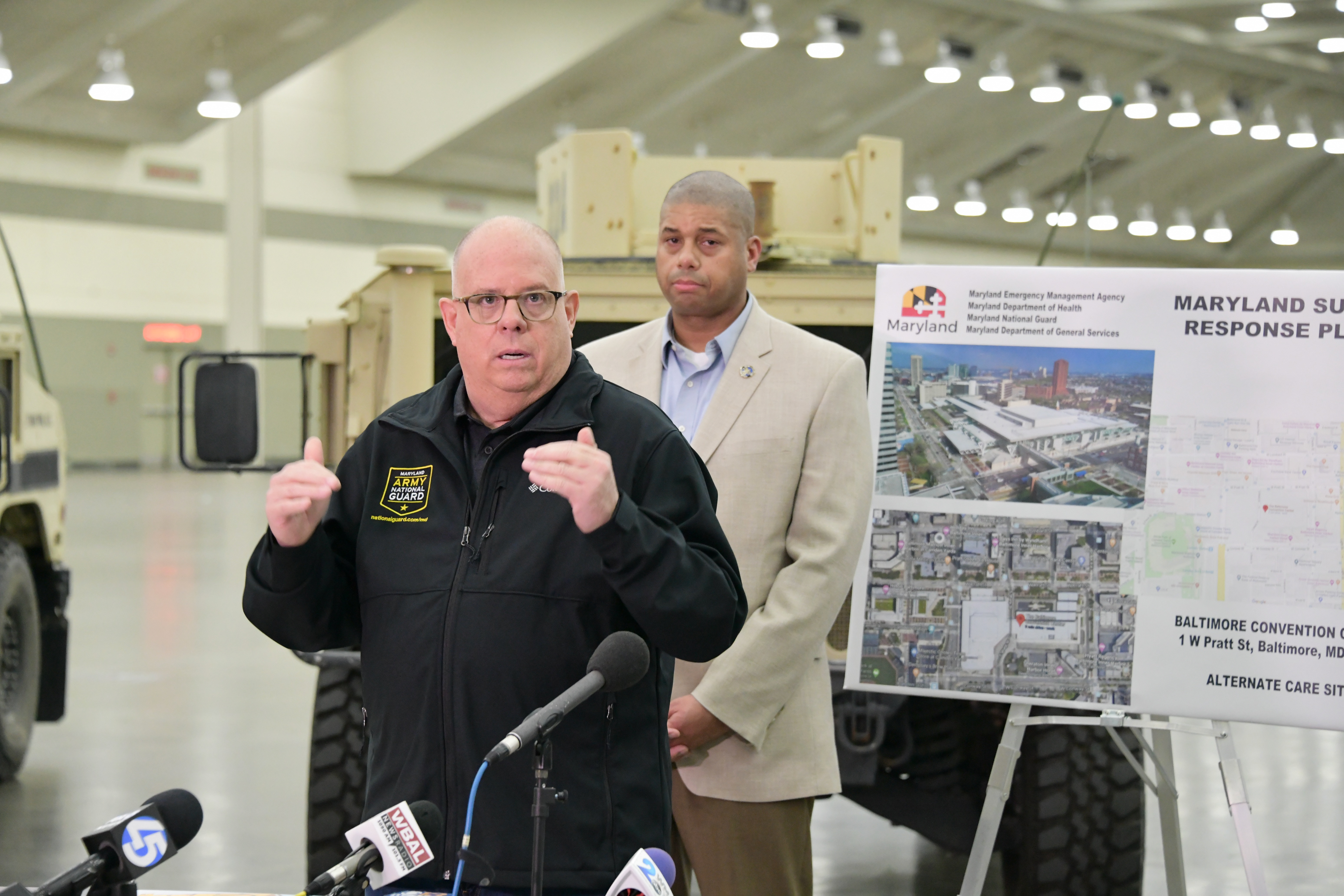
Governor Larry Hogan addressing the National Guard and Army Corps of Engineers

On February 4, 2020, the Baltimore Business Journal has reported that the Baltimore Convention Center will be "modernized" and not expanded due to a revised cost estimate of "more than $1.5 billion" to expand the convention center.

In March 2020, amid the COVID-19 pandemic, Governor Larry Hogan announced that the Convention Center would be turned into an alternate care site to deal with an expected surge of patients. It was later used as a testing and vaccination site. The facility was run jointly by Johns Hopkins Hospital and the University of Maryland Hospital.

=== Baltimore Convention Center Proposed Modernization and Expansion Project (2024-Present) ===
In early 2024, the Maryland General Assembly passed a bill (Maryland 2024 Legislative Session - Senate Bill 896) to create the Baltimore Convention and Tourism Redevelopment and Operating Authority Task Force under the Maryland Department of Commerce. The task force began on July 1, 2024 and has the stated mission of "to study and publish a report with recommendations concerning the membership, purpose and function of an entity or strategy to govern the renovation, revitalization, financing, ongoing maintenance and management of the Baltimore Convention site and certain surrounding areas." This task force started holding meetings on August 8, 2024 and has had subsequent meetings on September 4, October 9 and October 29. This 22-member task force has been discussing the potential future of the Baltimore Convention Center which includes renovation and expansion of the Baltimore Convention Center. According to an October 30, 2024 Baltimore Business Journal article, the Maryland Stadium Authority provided the task force with cost estimates for the renovation and potential expansion of the Baltimore Convention Center. At the least expensive option which would only involve renovating and modernizing both the east and west sections of the building, the Maryland Stadium Authority provided the cost estimate of $740 million to $774 million. With the most expensive option which would incorporate renovations and modernization along with an expansion that would add a 100,000 SF flex-space to the existing building, the Maryland Stadium Authority provided the cost estimate of $890 million to $930 million. The article mentions that this task force "is expected to provide a report with recommendations to the governor, mayor and the General Assembly this year" and that the idea for this task force is for the task force "to share how much renovations might cost, how the upgrades could be funded and how the convention center could be governed going forward."

On January 8, 2025, Baltimore Mayor Brandon Scott released his legislative priorities list for the 2025 Maryland General Assembly legislative session. Within the list, it lists that Mayor Scott wants to establish an oversight authority for the Baltimore Convention Center. This suggests that the Baltimore Convention and Tourism Redevelopment and Operating Authority Task Force has fully completed their assigned work and has released a final task force report with recommendations regarding the Baltimore Convention Center to the Mayor of Baltimore, the Baltimore City Council, the Maryland General Assembly and Governor Wes Moore as required by the bill that established the task force.

On an undetermined date, the meeting minutes for the Baltimore Convention and Tourism Redevelopment and Operating Authority Task Force meeting for October 29, 2024 was released to the public in which it reports that the previous proposal to renovate and expand the Baltimore Convention Center and add a new hotel that would be connected to the convention center was determined to be infeasible due to the estimated costs of construction which was stated to be $1.6 billion+. The Maryland Commerce Department Secretary, Kevin Anderson, inquired about what caused that determination that the cost of $1.6 billion made the proposal infeasible despite the study conducted by the MSA stated that either expanding or renovating the Baltimore Convention Center "would be warranted from an economic and fiscal perspective." The "primary reason" given to Secretary Anderson regarding the determination that the cost made the proposal infeasible "was that the planned updates were not something visitors would accept, it would not have been a great visitor experience." Another reason given "was that the costs were far more than what they had conceived at that time."

On an undetermined date, the final task force report containing the recommendations regarding the Baltimore Convention Center was released to the public. This Maryland Commerce Department task force has made a total of 3 recommendations that are described as being "required and integrally connected to the long-term viability of large-scale convention business in the state." (page 18). The three recommendations that have been made are: "1. Governance: Establishment of a Joint Authority to govern Convention Center and Tourism Board operations, effectively merging Visit Baltimore and the Baltimore Convention Center under a new governance model. 2. Ownership and Improvements Financing: State and City partnership on Convention Center improvements such as that the Mayor and City Council of Baltimore City retain ownership of the Baltimore City Convention Center, and in exchange for primarily or exclusively State-bonded improvements, the State of Maryland would receive a lienholder interest while the debt is outstanding. 3. Operational Sustainability: The Mayor and City Council of Baltimore City establish a direct revenue stream to the Authority that allows the Authority to meet its annual operating and capital needs." This final report also provides detailed information on the current status of the Baltimore Convention Center and provides the same exact warnings as previous studies conducted on the Baltimore Convention Center with regards to renovating and expansion wherein if absolutely nothing is done for the Baltimore Convention Center building, Baltimore City would see a decline in both events and conventions and as a result, both Baltimore City and the State of Maryland would see a loss of money (page 10). On page 9, a quote is cited to a 2021 report from the Maryland Stadium Authority in which it states that "remaining status quo will likely result in a steady decrease in event activity, particularly relative to convention, tradeshow and large meeting business," and warns that "while some of these events may choose to use other facilities in the State like the Gaylord National Resort & Convention Center, many will likely leave the State for other destinations such as Washington, D.C., Philadelphia, Boston and Nashville. As such, a decline in event activity would also yield a decrease in operating revenue, an increase in operating loss and less economic and fiscal impacts to local and State governments." As mentioned earlier in this section, Baltimore Mayor Brandon Scott wants introduced in the Maryland General Assembly during its 2025 session, a bill that would fulfill the first listed recommendation within this final report.

== Location ==
The Baltimore Convention Center is located within a superblock bounded by Charles Street, Pratt Street, Conway Street, and Howard Streets. The east and west halves of the Baltimore Convention Center are linked by an enclosed skywalk bridge over Sharp Street. The total land area of the Baltimore Convention Center is 608,968 square feet (56,575.0 m^{2}), or 13.980 acres (56,580 m^{2}) and the total enclosed area is 400,000 square feet (37,000 m^{2}). The structural engineers for the expansion of this project was Leslie E. Robertson Associates.

The west end of the facility—corner of Pratt and Howard Street—is served by the Convention Center/Pratt Street Station of the Maryland Transit Administration's light rail system, providing direct links to both BWI Airport and Baltimore Penn Station (MARC Penn Line and Amtrak Northeast Corridor trains). A major Maryland Transit Administration bus stop is located at the intersection of Pratt & Sharp Streets in front of the Baltimore Convention Center, near the western half of the Baltimore Convention Center (Pratt Street Entrance). The Camden Yards Light Rail Stop and Camden Line (MARC) station are also within walking distance of the facility.
