= Baltimore Development Corporation =

The Baltimore Development Corporation (BDC) is a nonprofit corporation and public-private agency contracted by the City of Baltimore to promote economic development.

== History/mergers ==
The City of Baltimore Development Corporation (BDC) traces its origins to 1991 when it was established under Mayor Kurt Schmoke's administration. BDC resulted from the consolidation of three predecessor organizations: City Center - Inner Harbor Development Inc., Baltimore Economic Development Corporation (BEDCO), and the Market Center Redevelopment Authority. Established as a non-profit corporation, BDC received its 501c3 status in 1992. Over the last three decades, BDC has continuously evolved and currently operates as the city's principal economic development agency.

In 1994, BDC established the Emerging Technology Centers (ETC) to support innovation. In 2018, it launched Made in Baltimore (MIB) as a program to further its initiatives. Both ETC and MIB later became independent nonprofit organizations, with primary funding from BDC.

BDC aims to support economic growth in the city by retaining, expanding, and attracting businesses, promoting investment, and increasing employment opportunities for residents.

The merger came in the wake of an expansion of the Open Meetings Act provoked by the City Council's frustration with the opacity of CC-IH.

== Structure ==
The BDC is not directly accountable to the municipal government of Baltimore. However, its board is appointed by the Mayor, and many of its economic programs require approval from the Baltimore City Council.

=== "City of Baltimore Development Corporation v. Carmel Realty Associates" ===
The BDC has a complicated legal status because it is a public-private status agency, also a non-profit organization, but also closely involved in city business. Criticisms of the BDC's secrecy and its predecessors since the early 1980s amid infamous charges then of a "shadow government" against the administration of then Mayor William Donald Schaefer, (1921-2011), [served 1971-1986], by the then Baltimore City Council President Walter S. Orlinsky and long-time financial/political "gadfly" Comptroller of the City, Hyman A. Pressman, (1914-1996), which circulated in the Baltimore media, including especially The Baltimore Sun, resulted in a 2006 Maryland Court of Appeals case titled City of Baltimore Development Corporation v. Carmel Realty Associates.

In this case, the court ruled that the BDC "was" subject to the Maryland "Public Information Act" and the Maryland "Open Meetings Act", rules that, like the federal Freedom of Information Act, require government bodies to disclose information to citizens. The main rationale for this decision was the mayor's control over the appointment of the board.

The updated version of the Maryland "Public Information Act Manual" now reads: "A nonprofit entity incorporated under the State’s general corporation law may also be considered a unit or instrumentality of a political subdivision for purposes of the PIA, if there is a sufficient nexus linking the entity to the local government. See Baltimore Development Corp. v. Carmel Realty Associates, 395 Md. 299, 910 A.2d 406 (2006) (nonprofit corporation formed to plan and implement long range development strategies in city was subject to substantial control by city and thus was instrumentality of city subject to PIA)".

== Tax credits ==
One of the BDC's major functions is to help businesses receive tax credits. The official rule for these credits is a "but for" test: they are only to be used when the project would not go into effect without them.

The BDC mediates several types of credits:

=== Payment in lieu of taxes ===
Payment in lieu of taxes (PILOT) is an agreement under which a company can pay the city an agreed-upon amount instead of the property taxes they would normally be assessed.

The BDC controlled 12 PILOTs as of October 2011. These represented $12.8 million in tax exemptions; the properties corresponding generated $15.4 million in other taxes (e.g., parking, energy, telephone).

=== Tax increment financing ===
Tax increment financing (TIF) is a way of subsidizing current development based on the expectation of future tax gains. To pay for a TIF subsidy, the city issues a bond, which it expect to pay back based later from taxes.

The state of Maryland authorized Baltimore to use TIFs in 1994; however, the city was required to secure voter approval through referendum and none were issued. In 2000, new legislation allowed the city to implement TIFs without voter approval.

As of October 2011, the BDC had issued 10 TIFs in Baltimore. (With one TIF issued to East Baltimore Development Inc. under direct city control.) These already represent a debt for the city of $135 million, with $315 million worth of additional bonds still to be issued.

=== Enterprise Zone ===
The BDC is responsible for Baltimore City's Enterprise Zones (EZs); businesses inside these zones are eligible for special tax credits. EZ "Focus Areas" offer extra benefits.

== Projects ==
The BDC oversees development of major downtown projects, as well as development of Baltimore city-owned business and industrial parks.

The corporation and the City are under public criticism for the planning, financing and construction of the Hilton Baltimore Convention Center Hotel. The $301 million, 750-room hotel near the city baseball and football stadiums is an almost entirely publicly funded project (through city bonds), expected to open in August 2008. Hilton Hotels Corporation is expected to contribute around $7.1 million to the project.

=== Emerging Technologies Center ===
The Emerging Technologies Center (ETC) is business incubator intended to support growing technology and biotechnology companies. The ETC had facilities in Canton and at Johns Hopkins Eastern. Its former President and Executive Director since April 2012 was Deborah A. Tillett.

The ETC ran a program called "AcclerateBaltimore" that gave $25,000 to emerging companies trying to bring a product to market. Of the four companies receiving this funding in 2012, three are developing web applications and one concerns machine learning. The program required these companies to stay in Baltimore for five years.

== Legal status ==
The BDC was the subject of a 2006 Maryland court ruling declaring that its board of directors meetings and all internal documents were subject to Freedom of Information Act requests under the Maryland state sunshine law.

== See also ==
- Baltimore Area Convention & Visitors Association
- Baltimore Convention Center Hotel Project
- Baltimore Convention Center
- Baltimore Visitors Center
- 1st Mariner Arena
- Inner Harbor
