= Peter Schmuck =

American journalist

- Born: September 8, 1955 (age 70)
- Education: California State University, Fullerton
- Occupation: Journalist
- Writing career
- Language: U.S.
- Genre: Non-fiction
- Subject: Sports

Peter Gilray Schmuck (born September 8, 1955, in California) is a retired American sportswriter.

Schmuck was a reporter for the Orange County Register and later a reporter and sports columnist for The Baltimore Sun before retiring in 2020. Named Maryland Sportswriter of the Year seven times by the National Sports Media Association, he primarily wrote about baseball and hosted a weekend talk show on WBAL AM 1090. For several years, he wrote a popular blog entitled "The Schmuck Stops Here" on the Baltimore Sun web site. He still writes columns for the website BaltimoreBaseball.com on an occasional basis.

A graduate of Cal State Fullerton, Schmuck first came to national attention in 1980 when the California Department of Motor Vehicles denied his request for a personalized license plate bearing his last name, claiming it was "obscene and offensive to public decency." The incident led to an appearance with comedian Buddy Hackett on an episode of the syndicated re-make of the game show You Bet Your Life.

During a sports writing career that spanned 43 years, Schmuck covered the Los Angeles Dodgers, California Angels and Baltimore Orioles as a beat writer before becoming the Baltimore Sun's national baseball reporter in 1994. He became that paper's general sports columnist in 2004 and remained in that role until retiring. He also served as a freelance columnist for The Sporting News during the 1990s and wrote for numerous sports magazines and baseball annuals.

In addition to his writing career, he served as a television baseball analyst for the FOX affiliate in Baltimore and spent two decades as a sports and political talk show host on WBAL Radio. He also appeared in five episodes of the MLB Network's Prime 9 and three episodes (Cal Ripken, Albert Belle and Ball Four) of ESPN's SportsCentury.

Schmuck was elected president of the Baseball Writers' Association of America in 2005.
