= Visit Baltimore =

Promotional organization for Baltimore, Maryland, U.S.

Coordinates: 39°17′2″N 76°36′44″W

Visit Baltimore, formerly the Baltimore Area Convention & Visitors Association (BACVA), is a 501(c)(6) non-profit primarily funded by visitor-paid hotel taxes whose mission is to "positively impact the quality of life of the people who live and work in Baltimore, Maryland by attracting visitor spending that creates jobs, supports local businesses and attractions, and generates needed revenue for the city and state." Its sales and marketing efforts focus on positioning Baltimore as a vibrant and welcoming destination for leisure visitors and meeting attendees, uplifting the city's scenic waterfront, historic achievements, arts and culture, culinary scene, charming neighborhoods, and more. The current President & CEO is Al Hutchinson. Charles G. "Chuck" Tildon, III is the Chair of the Baltimore Convention & Tourism Board.

== History ==
Concerned about how the departure of large manufacturers like Bethlehem Steel and General Motors from Baltimore would affect residents' quality of life, Mayor William Donald Schaefer set his sights on revitalizing the Inner Harbor to position Baltimore as an ideal tourist destination. This led to the construction of a new Baltimore Convention Center in 1979 and the establishment of the Baltimore Convention Bureau in 1982. The Bureau was established as a 501(c)(6) organization overseen by a six-person Board of Directors, including one representative from the Mayor of Baltimore's office, to promote the city as "a place for conventions, tourism, and civic events."

Eventually, the Baltimore Convention Bureau was renamed the Baltimore Area Convention & Visitors Association (BACVA). Throughout the early 2000s, BACVA supported several downtown development projects to make Baltimore a more competitive leisure and meetings destination. Together with the Baltimore Development Corporation (BDC), they lobbied the Baltimore City Council to approve a $305 million, 752-room Hilton Hotel adjacent to the Baltimore Convention Center. The original proposal dictated that 600 of the 752 rooms would always be available to BACVA groups, though it was agreed that the final number would be determined upon the hotel's opening. On August 15, 2005, the Baltimore City Council approved the project, and the hotel officially opened in August 2008 with an elevated skybridge connecting it to the convention center.

Following naming conventions set by other destination marketing organizations, BACVA changed its name to Visit Baltimore in 2009. Then-President and CEO Tom Noonan called the change "a smart move that will better position the destination in this increasingly competitive marketplace and make it easier for potential travelers to find us."

After nine years with Visit Baltimore, Tom Noonan resigned in 2016 to lead the Austin Convention and Visitors Bureau. Chief Operating Officer Ron Melton took on the role of interim president until Al Hutchinson, a veteran hospitality and destination marketing executive, was hired to head Visit Baltimore. Hutchinson had previously served as president and CEO of Visit Mobile in Alabama.

In 2019, Visit Baltimore aggressively pitched and won the bid to host the Central Intercollegiate Athletic Association (CIAA) Men's and Women's Basketball Tournament that had been held in Charlotte, North Carolina for fifteen years. After being cancelled in 2020 due to the COVID-19 pandemic, the first in-person CIAA Tournament in Baltimore took place in February 2021. It welcomed 36,390 visitors and generated $19.6 million in economic impact for the city. The CIAA has committed to holding the tournament in Baltimore through 2026.

Al Hutchinson announced in February 2025 that he would not be renewing his contract, set to expire June 30, and instead would assume a consultant role to help Visit Baltimore search for a new leader. Many milestones were achieved during Hutchinson's tenure, including record-breaking visitation, the establishment of the Tourism Improvement District and the securing of large events like the CIAA Tournament and ASAE Annual Meeting. Current Vice President of Sales & Customer Experience, Kireem Swinton, will assume the role of Interim President & CEO on July 1.

== Baltimore Visitor Center ==
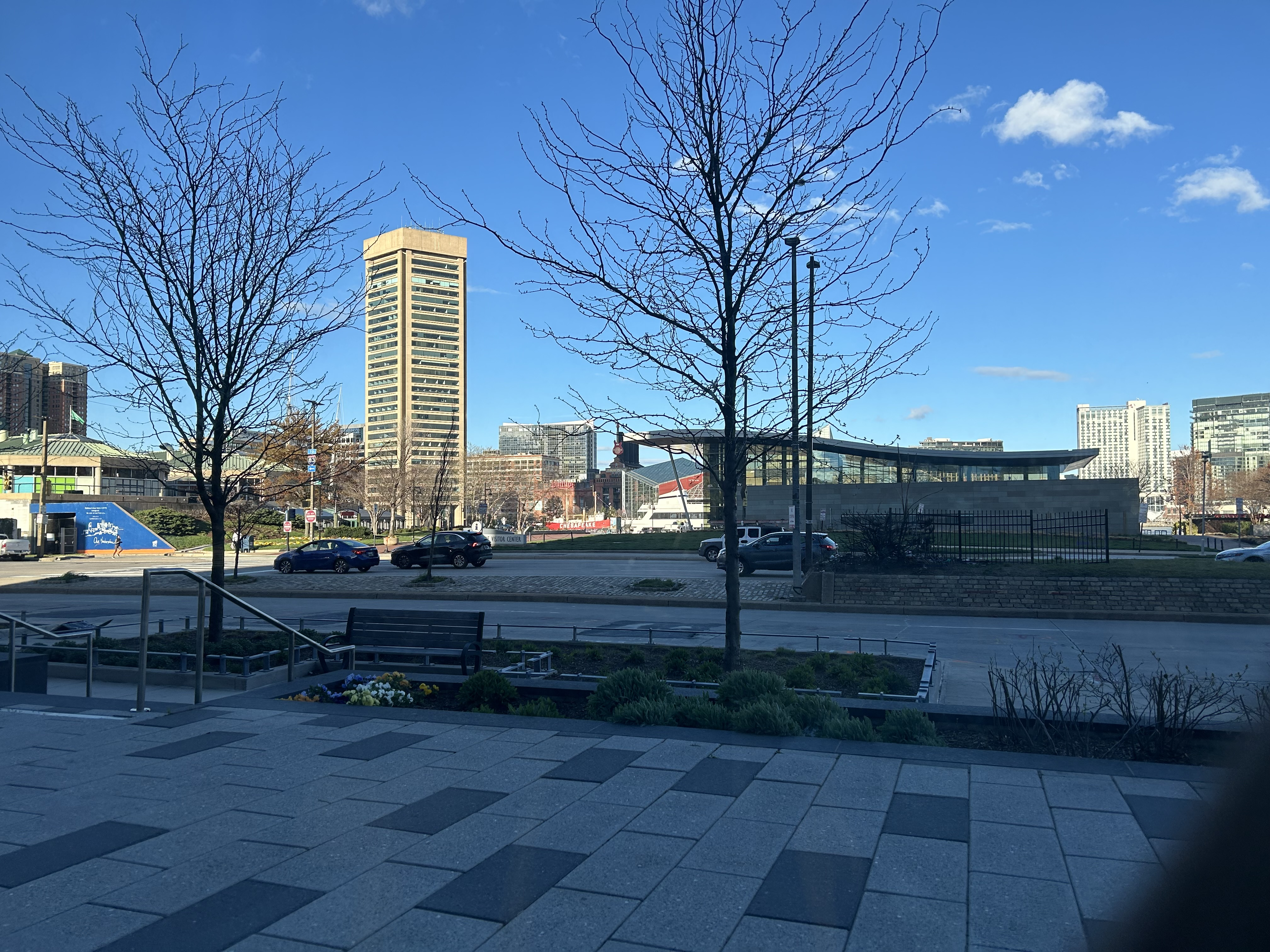
Exterior view from Light Street (April 2024)

The Baltimore Visitor Center opened on May 7, 2004, in the heart of the Inner Harbor between the Harborplace Light Street Pavilion and the Maryland Science Center. It is owned by the City of Baltimore and managed by Visit Baltimore. Designed by Ayers Saint Gross, the 8,000-square-foot (740 m2) building cost $4.5 million to construct and features a wavy roof, glass walls and a custom sculpture by Baltimore-based artists Jenn Figg and Matthew McCormack suspended from the ceiling. Landscaping by PELA features a brick plaza connecting the promenade and Conway Street as well as a shaded picnic area to the left of the Visitor Center. In its first year of operation, the Baltimore Visitor Center received 382,404 visitors, far surpassing BACVA's original estimate of 250,000. The Visitor Center was closed for two years in 2020 due to the COVID-19 pandemic but has seen steady visitation since reopening with a modified schedule in 2022. In 2024, the Visitor Center saw an estimated 65,000 visitors.

The Baltimore Visitor Center houses more than 200 brochures, visitor guides, and maps to Baltimore institutions such as the National Museum of Railroad History & Innovation, Fort McHenry, Watermark Cruises, and the Star-Spangled Banner Flag House. Interactive LED touchscreens provide visitors with information about attractions, museums, restaurants, lodging, and wayfinding. Staff are available to answer questions and help make reservations.
