= H. Naoto =

Japanese fashion designer

- Born: Naoto Hirooka; 1977 (age 48–49); Japan
- Occupation: Fashion designer

Naoto Hirooka (Japanese: 廣岡 直人, Hepburn: Hiro'oka Naoto; born 1977), known professionally as H. Naoto (stylized as h.NAOTO), is a Japanese imaginations-related fashion designer. H. Naoto's style of clothing and accessories could be classified under Japanese punk and Gothic Lolita, and he has been called the "most visible and successful of the labels fixated on that style."

== Biography ==
He graduated from Bunka Fashion College in Tokyo, joined S-inc. in 1999, and launched his own brand, h.NAOTO in the Spring/Summer of 2000.

H. Naoto created a dress worn by Amy Lee of Evanescence at the 2004 Grammy Awards. He has also designed costumes for the bands Ayabie, Psycho le Cému (for the Prism PV), Gackt, Skin, Marbell, and Hangry & Angry.
