= List of tallest buildings in Baltimore =

Skyline of Baltimore
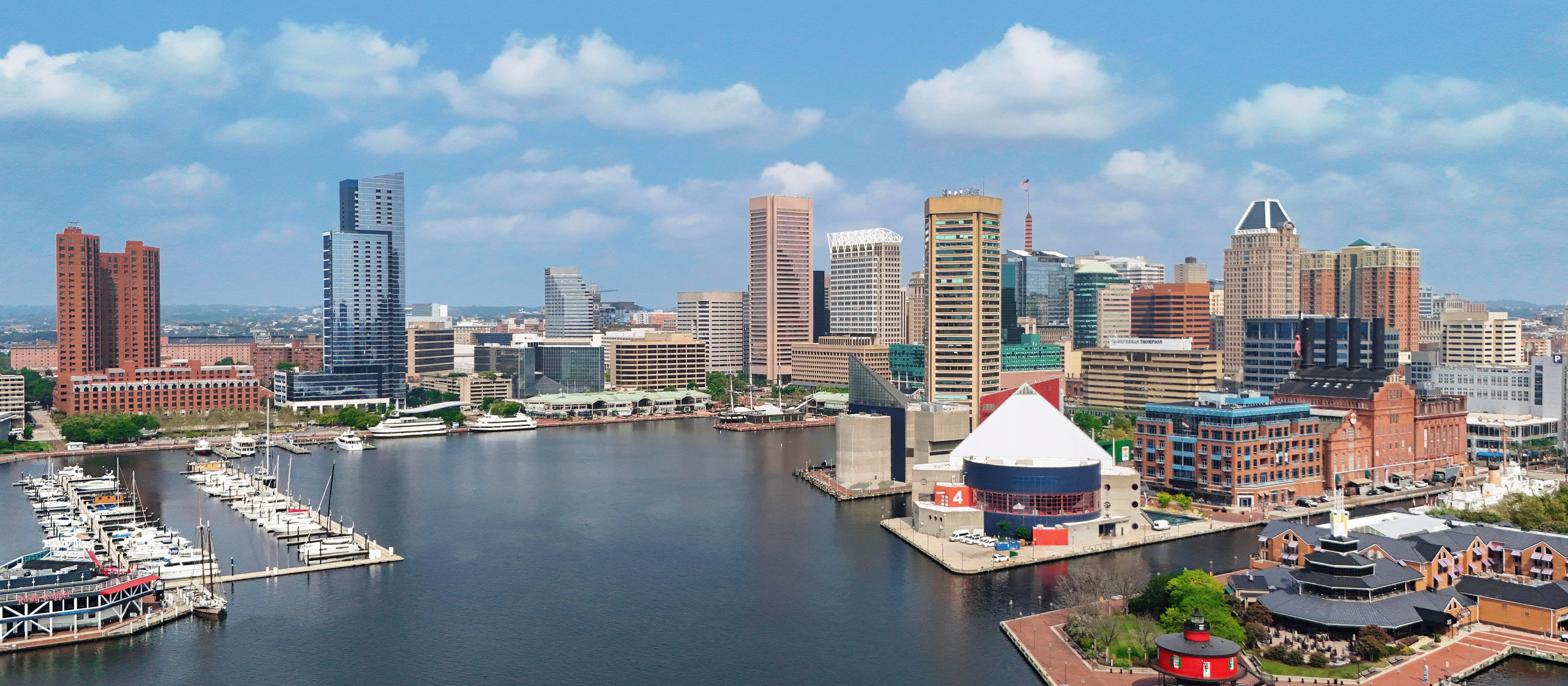
- Baltimore's Inner Harbor in 2025
- Tallest building: 100 Light Street (1973)
- Tallest building height: 529 ft (161.2 m)
- First 150 m+ building: Bank of America Building (1929)

Number of tall buildings (2026)
- Taller than 100 m (328 ft): 25
- Taller than 150 m (492 ft): 4

Number of tall buildings — feet
- Taller than 200 ft (61.0 m): 73
- Taller than 300 ft (91.4 m): 35

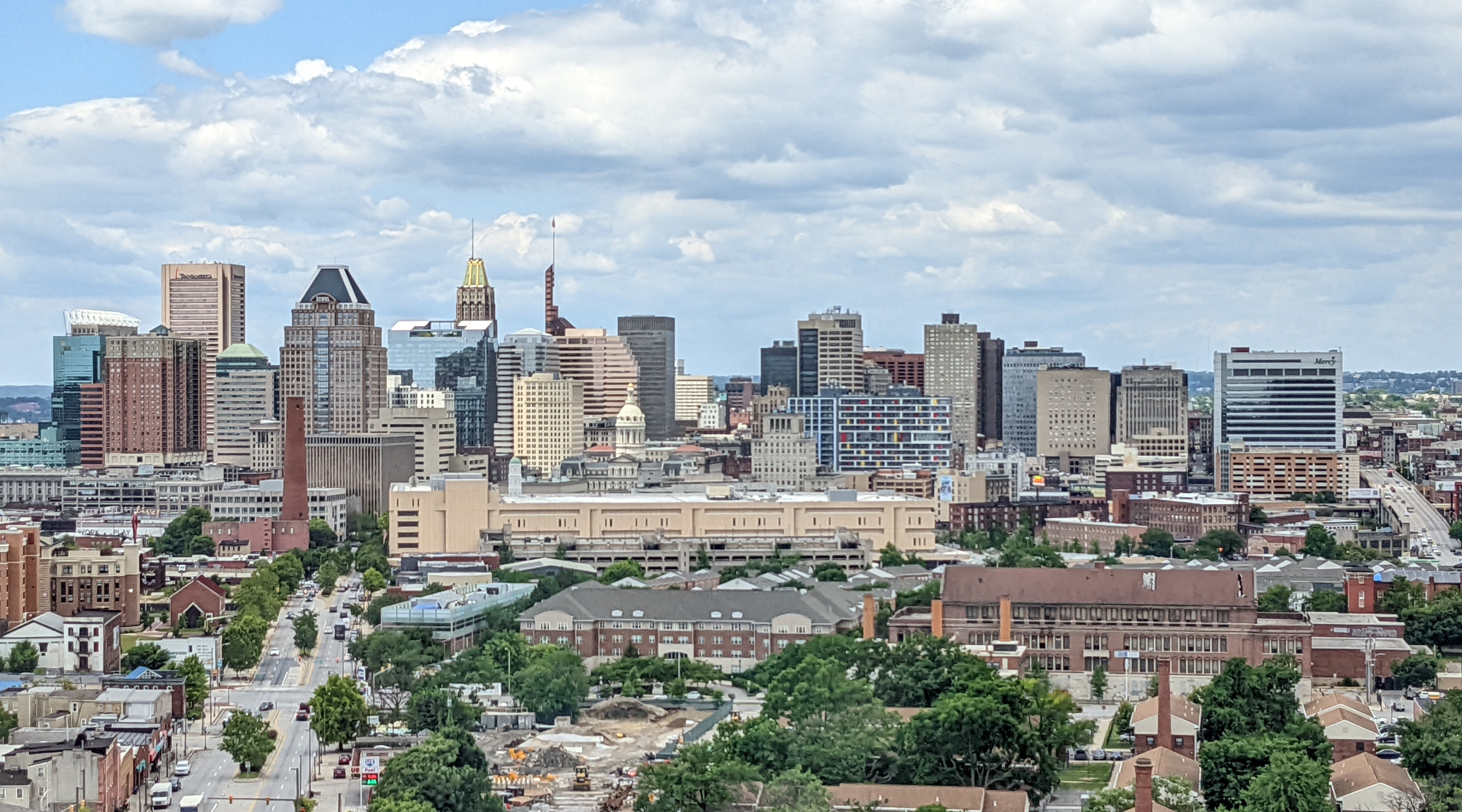
Downtown Baltimore from the east in 2022

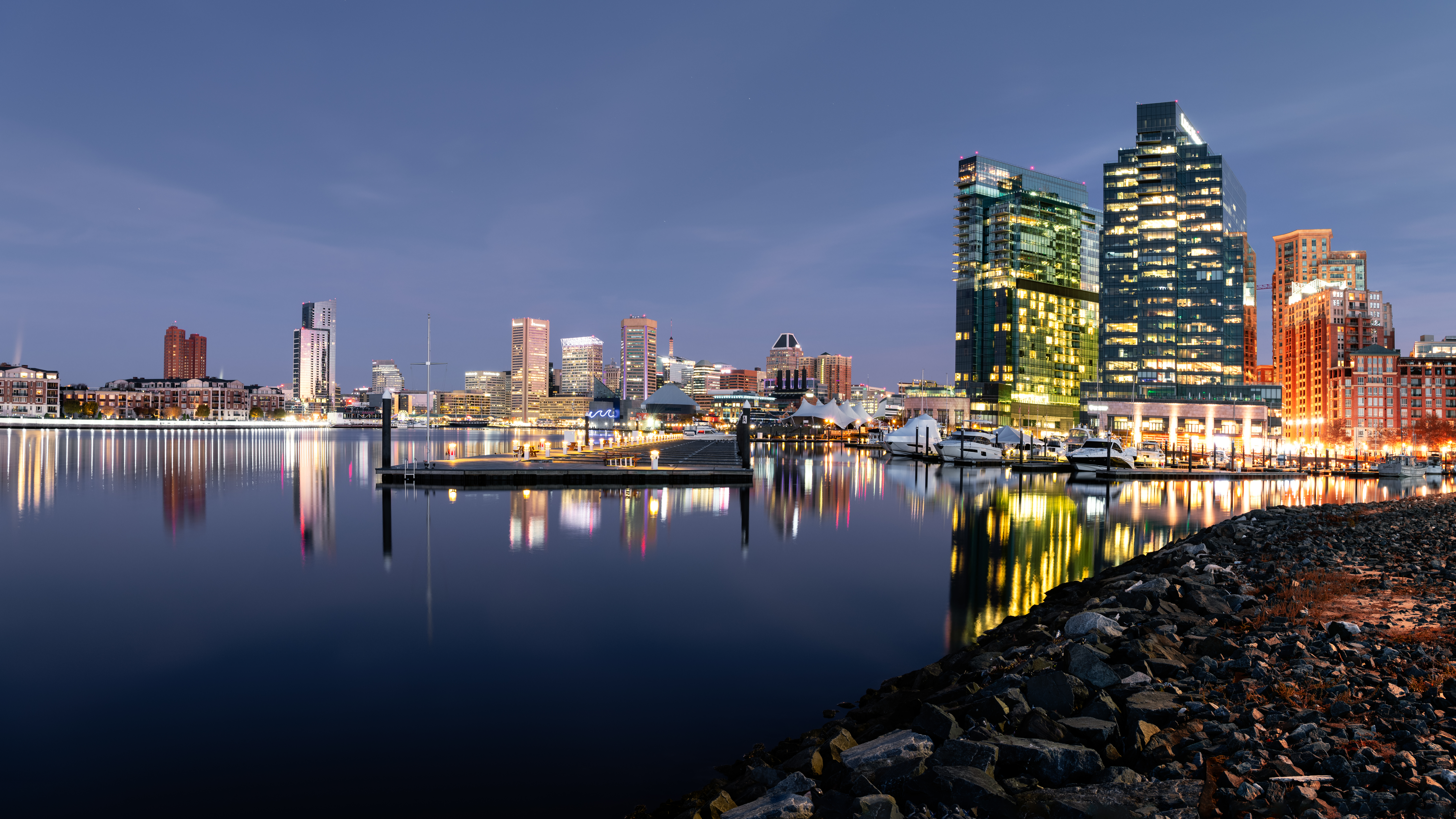
Buildings on the Patapsco River at night in 2019

Baltimore is the largest city in the U.S. state of Maryland, with a metropolitan area population of 2.8 million. The city is home to most of Maryland's tallest buildings. The city has 73 buildings over 200 ft (61 m) in height as of 2026. 35 of them exceed 300 ft (91 m) in height, the most of any city in the Mid-Atlantic outside the metropolitan areas of New York City and Philadelphia. Four skyscrapers exceed 492 ft (150 m) in height. The tallest building in Baltimore and Maryland is the 40-story 100 Light Street (formerly and still commonly known as the Transamerica Tower), which rises 529 feet (161 m) and was completed in 1973.

As one of the largest cities in the United States in the late 19th century, Baltimore is the site of some of the earliest high-rises in the country. Baltimore's first high-rise, the 10-story Equitable Building, was completed in 1883 and was followed by the Fidelity Building in 1893. An early construction boom lasted from the 1890s until the Great Baltimore Fire of 1904. The fire destroyed 1,500 buildings, including some of the newly built towers. Construction resumed from the 1910s to the 1920s. Notable skyscrapers include the Renaissance Revival Emerson Bromo-Seltzer Tower in 1911 and the Art Deco Bank of America Building in 1929. Following the onset of the Great Depression, skyscraper development slowed over the next three decades.

The next period of high-rise construction lasted from the late 1950s to the early 1990s, during which the city saw the completion of the Transamerica Tower, the city's tallest building; the Baltimore World Trade Center, the tallest regular pentagonal skyscraper in the world; and the postmodern Commerce Place, featuring a tapering top. The Inner Harbor was largely developed during this period, with projects such as Harborplace. In the early 21st century, high-rise development has spread further eastwards along the Patapsco River with the Inner Harbor East and Harbor Point neighborhoods. Baltimore's most recent major skyscraper is 414 Light Street, a 500 ft (152 m) residential building completed in 2018 as the city's third-tallest building.

Baltimore's tallest buildings are concentrated in Downtown Baltimore and the Inner Harbor, northwest of the estuary of the Patapsco River. There are also several residential towers in the neighborhood of Mid-Town Belvedere, as well as high-rises around the campuses of Johns Hopkins University and the University of Maryland, Baltimore. In Baltimore's metropolitan area, there are an appreciable number of high-rises in the cities of Columbia and Towson. Due to height restrictions in nearby Washington D.C. as a result of the Height of Buildings Act of 1910, Baltimore has the tallest buildings in the Washington–Baltimore combined statistical area of over 10 million people.

== History ==
Number of buildings by height in Baltimore by the end of each year, based on the information in this article. This takes into account three demolished buildings. Click on the legend to toggle a specific height on or off. View chart definition.

The history of skyscrapers in Baltimore began with the completion in 1883 of the Equitable Building. The Equitable Building is located at the southwest corner of North Calvert and East Fayette Street, across from the Beaux Arts/Classical Revival architecture of the Baltimore City Courthouse and the landmark Battle Monument in Battle Monument Square, commemorating the fallen in the defense of the city during the 1814 Battle of Baltimore in the War of 1812. "The Equitable", as it became known, replaced an earlier landmark from 1825, Barnum's City Hotel, and was the first steel cage framed building with outside surface panels of stone hung on the frame, a new technique pioneered by Chicago architects like Louis Sullivan and Daniel Burnham.

The Fidelity Building was constructed shortly after in 1893. Both the Fidelity Building and the Equitable Building are regarded as the first high-rises in the city. The Fidelity Building originally rose eight floors, but an additional seven stories with a terra cotta panels façade designed to match the original earlier grey granite rough-cut stone base, were constructed between 1912 and 1915, bringing the structure's total height to 220 feet (67 m), making it the first building in Baltimore to exceed 200 feet (61 m).

Baltimore went through an early high-rise construction boom from the late 1890s to the Great Baltimore Fire of February 1904. During the fire, six of the new skyscraper's interiors burned out. Most were later judged by inspecting engineers/architects as structurally sound with their steel I-beam cage framing and masonry facades and were reconstructed and rehabilitated in the next five years in a flurry of downtown rebuilding. The next period from the 1910s to the late 1920s, during which time the Baltimore Trust Company Tower (now the Bank of America Building) were constructed.

The city's central business district then experienced a long fallow period due to the Great Depression of the 1930s and the defense industrial efforts of World War II. Very few skyscrapers were constructed during this period, and downtown remained relatively stable. The release of the Charles Center project proposal by the recently organized Greater Baltimore Committee and the local Chamber of Commerce contributed to the beginning of another construction boom from the late 1950s to the early 1970s. This was followed by the "Inner Harbor" redevelopment around the old waterfront piers, wharves, warehouses, offices and businesses of the former "Basin" along the Baltimore Harbor at the Northwest Branch of the Patapsco River. Among the buildings completed in the second half of the 20th century include the United States Fidelity and Guarantee Company's new headquarters (later the Legg Mason Building, now the Transamerica Tower) at the corner of the harbor at Pratt and Light Streets, and the five-sides/pentagonal high-rise centerpiece of the harbor, the Baltimore World Trade Center for the Maryland Port Administration in 1977.

== Cityscape ==
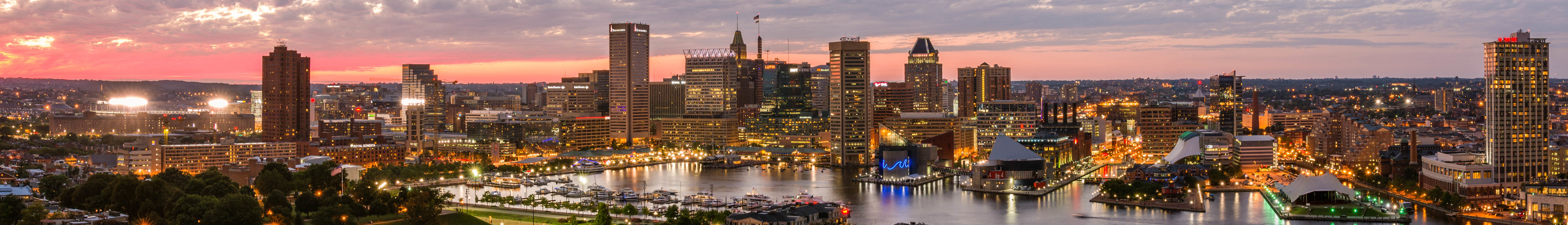
Panorama of Baltimore's Inner Harbor in 2016

== Map of tallest buildings ==
The map below shows the location of buildings taller than 200 ft (61 m) in Baltimore. Each marker is numbered by the building's height rank, and colored by the decade of its completion.

Buildings taller than 200 ft (61 m) in Baltimore. An asterisk (*) next to the building's name indicates it is located outside the map.
- 1950s and before
- 1960s
- 1970s
- 1980s
- 1990s
- 2000s
- 2010s
- 2020s
1 100 Light Street
2 Bank of America Building
3 414 Light Street
4 William Donald Schaefer Building
5 Commerce Place
6 Baltimore Marriott Waterfront Hotel
7 100 East Pratt Street
8 Baltimore World Trade Center
9 Tremont Plaza Hotel
10 Charles Towers South Apartments
11 1 Light Street
12 One North Charles
13 250 West Pratt Street
14 Towers at Harbor Court
15 Four Seasons Hotel Baltimore
16 201 North Charles Street Building
17 Charles Towers North Apartments
18 St. Paul Plaza
19 Legg Mason Tower
20 Exelon Tower
21 The Gallery at Harborplace
22 414 Water Street
23 HarborView Condominium
24 Charles Center South
25 Wells Fargo Tower
26 Redwood Tower
27 Canton Crossing Tower*
28 120 East Baltimore Street
29 Lord Baltimore Hotel
30 Mercantile Deposit and Trust
31 25 South Charles
32 Silo Point*
33 Vue Harbor East
34 Mary Catherine Bunting Building
35 Vivo Living Baltimore South
36 George H. Fallon Federal Office Building
37 39 West Lexington
38 Emerson Bromo-Seltzer Tower
39 Liberty Harbor East
40 Vivo Living Baltimore North
41 Mercy Medical Center Inpatient Tower
42 750 East Pratt Street
43 Avalon 555 President
44 Park Charles
45 One Charles Center
46 100 South Charles Street
47 300 East Lombard Street
48 The Residences at 300 St. Paul
49 First National Bank Building
50 One Calvert Plaza
51 Allied Harbor Point
52 Shiekh Zayed Tower
53 Standard Oil Building
54 Health Sciences Research Facility III
55 Bressler Research Building
56 John and Frances Angelos Law Center*
57 Constellation Energy Building Annex
58 Munsey Building
59 Hilton Baltimore
60 Maryland State Office Building*
61 Charlotte R. Bloomberg Children's Center
62 Fidelity Building
63 St. Paul at Chase Condominiums*
64 10 East Baltimore Street
65 Baltimore College of Dental Surgery
66 The B & O Building
67 The Zenith
68 Court Square Building
69 Alfred Blalock Building
70 Spinnaker Bay
71 The Essential
72 Telephone Building
73 Centerpoint
74 J Van Story Branch Sr. Apartments

== Tallest buildings ==
This list ranks completed buildings in Baltimore that stand at least 200 ft (61 m) tall as of 2026, based on standard height measurement. This includes spires and architectural details but does not include antenna masts. The "Year" column indicates the year of completion. Buildings tied in height are sorted by year of completion with earlier buildings ranked first, and then alphabetically.

Was the tallest building in Baltimore upon completion

Rank	Name	Image	Location	Height ft (m)	Floors	Year	Purpose	Notes
1	100 Light Street		39°17′14″N 76°36′52″W	529 (161.2)	40	1973	Office	Tallest building in Baltimore and Maryland since 1973. Tallest building in the city completed in the 1970s. In 2011, the building was renamed the Transamerica Tower. However, Transamerica left the tower in 2023, and the building's name was reverted to its address.
2	Bank of America Building		39°17′21″N 76°36′51″W	509 (155.2)	37	1929	Residential	Also known as 10 Light Street. Built as the Baltimore Trust Company Building. Tallest building in Baltimore completed in the 1920s. Tallest building in Baltimore from 1929 to 1973. Originally an office building, it was converted to apartments in 2015.
3	414 Light Street		39°17′02″N 76°36′49″W	500 (152.4)	44	2018	Residential	Opened for occupancy in 2018, the building's roof was topped out in November 2017. Built on the original site of the McCormick & Company Factory that was razed in the 1980s. Tallest building in the city completed in the 2010s.
4	William Donald Schaefer Building		39°17′23″N 76°36′50″W	493 (150.3)	29	1992	Office	Tallest building in the city completed in the 1990s.
5	Commerce Place		39°17′22″N 76°36′38″W	454 (138.4)	31	1992	Office	
6	Baltimore Marriott Waterfront Hotel		39°17′00″N 76°36′10″W	430 (131.1)	32	2001	Hotel	Tallest hotel building in Baltimore.
7	100 East Pratt Street		39°17′14″N 76°36′46″W	419 (127.6)	28	1992	Office	
8	Baltimore World Trade Center		39°17′10″N 76°36′35″W	405 (123.5)	32	1977	Office	Tallest regular pentagonal building in the world.
9	Tremont Plaza Hotel		39°17′32″N 76°36′51″W	395 (120.4)	37	1967	Hotel	Tallest building in Baltimore completed in the 1960s. Formerly the Tremont Plaza Hotel.
10	Charles Towers South Apartments	Two Charles Center	39°17′31″N 76°37′00″W	385 (117.4)	30	1969	Residential	
11	1 Light Street		39°17′21″N 76°36′48″W	364 (111)	26	2019	Mixed-use	Mixed-use office and residential building.
12	One North Charles		39°17′25″N 76°36′53″W	360 (109.7)	30	1962	Office	Formerly known as the Blaustein Building until 2017.
13	250 West Pratt Street		39°17′12″N 76°37′08″W	360 (109.7)	24	1986	Office	Tallest building in the city completed in the 1980s.
14	Towers at Harbor Court		39°16′57″N 76°36′52″W	356 (108.5)	28	1987	Residential	
15	Four Seasons Hotel Baltimore		39°16′58″N 76°36′08″W	352 (107.3)	28	2011	Mixed-use	Mixed-use residential and hotel building.
16	201 North Charles Street Building		39°17′29″N 76°36′54″W	350 (106.7)	28	1967	Office	
17	Charles Towers North Apartments		39°17′33″N 76°36′58″W	350 (106.7)	27	1967	Residential	Also known as Eight Charles Center.
18	St. Paul Plaza		39°17′29″N 76°36′52″W	350 (106.7)	25	1989	Office	
19	Legg Mason Tower		39°16′57″N 76°36′06″W	350 (106.7)	24	2009	Office	Tallest building completed in Baltimore in the 2000s.
20	Exelon Tower		39°16′52″N 76°35′55″W	350 (106.7)	20	2016	Mixed-use	Mixed-use office and residential building.
21	The Gallery at Harborplace		39°17′15″N 76°36′43″W	346 (105.5)	28	1988	Mixed-use	Developed by The Rouse Company, The Gallery at Harborplace is a mixed-use development consisting of The Gallery Mall (permanently closed), Harborplace Tower, and Renaissance Baltimore Harborplace Hotel.
22	414 Water Street		39°17′20″N 76°36′34″W	344 (104.8)	33	2008	Residential	
23	HarborView Condominium		39°16′39″N 76°36′15″W	343 (104.4)	29	1993	Residential	Also known as Harborview Tower.
24	Charles Center South		39°17′17″N 76°36′56″W	330 (100.6)	25	1975	Office	
25	Wells Fargo Tower		39°17′24″N 76°36′49″W	330 (100.6)	25	1985	Office	Formerly known as First Union Signet Tower and Wachovia Tower.
26	Redwood Tower	–	39°17′19″N 76°36′42″W	323 (98.5)	23	1987	Office	
27	Canton Crossing Tower		39°16′32″N 76°34′08″W	323 (98.5)	17	2006	Mixed-use	Mixed-use office and residential building. Also known as First Mariner Bank.
28	120 East Baltimore Street		39°17′23″N 76°36′46″W	320 (97.5)	25	1989	Office	Also known as SunTrust Bank Building, Bank of Baltimore Building, and Crestar Bank Building.
29	Lord Baltimore Hotel		39°17′23″N 76°36′58″W	315 (96)	23	1928	Hotel	Also known as Radisson Plaza Hotel Inner Harbor.
30	Mercantile Deposit and Trust		39°17′21″N 76°37′02″W	315 (96)	21	1969	Residential	Also known as 2 Hopkins Plaza, 10 Hopkins Plaza, and 2Hopkins. Originally an office building, it was converted to residential use in 2017.
31	25 South Charles	M&T Bank Building taken on 2025.05.25	39°17′18″N 76°36′53″W	315 (96)	22	1972	Office	Previously known as M&T Bank Building and the First Maryland Building.
32	Silo Point		39°16′12″N 76°35′18″W	310 (94.5)	24	2009	Residential	Formerly a grain elevator built in 1923, known as the Baltimore and Ohio Locust Point Grain Terminal Elevator. In 2009, it was converted from a grain elevator to a condominium tower.
33	Vue Harbor East		39°17′00″N 76°36′05″W	306 (93.3)	30	2007	Mixed-use	Mixed-use residential and hotel building.
34	Mary Catherine Bunting Building		39°17′39″N 76°36′47″W	302 (92.1)	18	2010	Health	Part of the Mercy Medical Center.
35	Vivo Living Baltimore South		39°17′23″N 76°37′02″W	302 (92.0)	27	1974	Residential	Formerly a hotel building, part of the Inner Harbour complex. Converted to residential use in 2024.
36	George H. Fallon Federal Office Building		39°17′17″N 76°37′00″W	298 (91) (Note: Sources do not state the exact height of this building. This figure was determined using Google Earth by subtracting the altitude of the building's lowest main pedestrian open-air entrance from its highest architectural point.)	17	1967	Office	
37	39 West Lexington		39°17′28″N 76°37′01″W	293 (89.3)	21	1916	Residential	Formerly known as the Baltimore Gas and Electric Company Building, Constellation Energy/BG&E Building, and Lexington Street Building West Tower. Tallest building in Baltimore from 1916 to 1929.
38	Emerson Bromo-Seltzer Tower	framelss	39°17′16″N 76°37′14″W	289 (88.1)	15	1911	Office	Often just called the Emerson Tower, the Bromo-Seltzer Tower, or the Bromo Tower. Tallest building in Baltimore from 1911 to 1916.
39	Liberty Harbor East		39°16′59″N 76°35′54″W	288 (88)	22	2018	Residential	
40	Vivo Living Baltimore North		39°17′24″N 76°37′01″W	280 (85.3)	27	1967	Residential	Formerly a hotel building, part of the Inner Harbour complex. Converted to residential use in 2024.
41	Mercy Medical Center Inpatient Tower	–	39°17′34″N 76°36′48″W	276 (84)	20	1963	Health	
42	750 East Pratt Street		39°17′14″N 76°36′20″W	272 (83)	18	2002	Office	
43	Avalon 555 President	Avalon 555 President	39°17′05″N 76°36′08″W	271 (82.6)	24	2020	Residential	Also known as 800 Fleet.
44	Park Charles		39°17′29″N 76°36′58″W	270 (82.3)	25	1985	Residential	
45	One Charles Center		39°17′27″N 76°36′57″W	269 (82)	25	1963	Office	
46	100 South Charles Street		39°17′13″N 76°36′55″W	265 (81)	17	1980	Office	Also known as the Bank of America Center - Tower I and NationsBank Center.
47	300 East Lombard Street		39°17′18″N 76°36′38″W	261 (80)	20	1984	Office	Also known as the Baltimore Federal Financial Building.
48	The Residences at 300 St. Paul		39°17′34″N 76°36′52″W	259 (78.9)	19	1957	Residential	
49	First National Bank Building		39°17′19″N 76°36′51″W	254 (77.4)	20	1924	Office	
50	One Calvert Plaza		39°17′22″N 76°36′43″W	250 (76.2)	16	1901	Office	Tallest building in Baltimore from 1901 to 1911.
51	Allied Harbor Point	–	39°16′51″N 76°35′51″W	246 (75) (Note: Sources do not state the exact height of this building. This figure is an estimate based on the number of above-ground floors, based on a height of 3 metres (9.8 feet) per floor.)	25	2025	Residential	
52	Shiekh Zayed Tower		39°17′47″N 76°35′32″W	234 (71)	12	2012	Health	Part of the Johns Hopkins Children's Center.
53	Standard Oil Building		39°17′44″N 76°36′49″W	233 (71)	15	1922	Residential	Also known as The Standard. Originally an office building, it was converted to residential use in 2002.
54	Health Sciences Research Facility III		39°17′24″N 76°37′35″W	233 (71)	13	2018	Education	Part of the School of Medicine at the University of Maryland, Baltimore.
55	Bressler Research Building	–	39°17′20″N 76°37′32″W	232 (71)	14	1976	Education	Part of the University of Maryland, Baltimore.
56	John and Frances Angelos Law Center		39°18′21″N 76°36′57″W	231 (70.5)	12	2013	Education	
57	Constellation Energy Building Annex	–	39°17′28″N 76°37′01″W	225 (68.6)	14	1966	Office	
58	Munsey Building		39°17′25″N 76°36′43″W	224 (68.3)	17	1912	Residential	Originally an office building, it was converted to apartments in 2002.
59	Hilton Baltimore		39°17′09″N 76°37′17″W	224 (68.3)	20	2008	Hotel	
60	Maryland State Office Building		39°18′09″N 76°37′22″W	223 (68)	15	1957	Office	
61	Charlotte R. Bloomberg Children's Center		39°17′45″N 76°35′28″W	221 (67)	12	2012	Health	Part of the Johns Hopkins Children's Center.
62	Fidelity Building		39°17′29″N 76°36′56″W	220 (67.2)	15	1893	Office	Tallest building in Baltimore from 1893 to 1901.
63	St. Paul at Chase Condominiums		39°18′10″N 76°36′51″W	217 (66.2)	22	1965	Residential	
64	10 East Baltimore Street	–	39°17′23″N 76°36′53″W	216 (66)	16	1973	Office	Also known as the WR Grace Building.
65	Baltimore College of Dental Surgery	–	39°17′23″N 76°37′32″W	215 (66)	10	2005	Education	Part of the University of Maryland, Baltimore.
66	The B & O Building		39°17′24″N 76°36′56″W	213 (65)	16	1906	Office	
67	The Zenith	–	39°17′09″N 76°37′21″W	208 (63.4)	21	2007	Residential	
68	Court Square Building		39°17′29″N 76°36′44″W	207 (63)	18	1929	Office	
69	Alfred Blalock Building	–	39°17′53″N 76°35′33″W	207 (63)	14	1951	Health	Part of Johns Hopkins Hospital.
70	Spinnaker Bay	–	39°16′58″N 76°36′04″W	207 (63)	19	2005	Residential	
71	The Essential	–	39°18′03″N 76°35′27″W	206 (63)	20	2012	Residential	Affiliated student housing for Johns Hopkins University.
72	Telephone Building		39°17′36″N 76°36′52″W	205 (62.5)	14	1941	Office	Also known as the Chesapeake & Potomac Telephone Building.
73	Centerpoint	–	39°17′25″N 76°37′12″W	205 (62.5)	17	2004	Residential	
74	J Van Story Branch Sr Apartments	–	39°19′16″N 76°37′03″W	61 (+200)	20	1973	Residential	

== Tallest demolished ==
There have been three buildings taller than 200 ft (61 m) in Baltimore that no longer stand today.

Name	Image	Height ft (m)	Floors	Year completed	Year demolished	Notes
Tower Building	–	330 (100.6)	16	1912	1987	Also known as the Maryland Casualty Company Tower. Demolished in 1986 due to structural instability.
Broadway Homes Tower	–	231 (70.4)	22	1971	2000	
New Emerson Hotel	–	220 (67.1)	18	1911	1971	Demolished in 1971 for the SunTrust Bank Building (now 120 East Baltimore Street).

== Timeline of tallest buildings ==
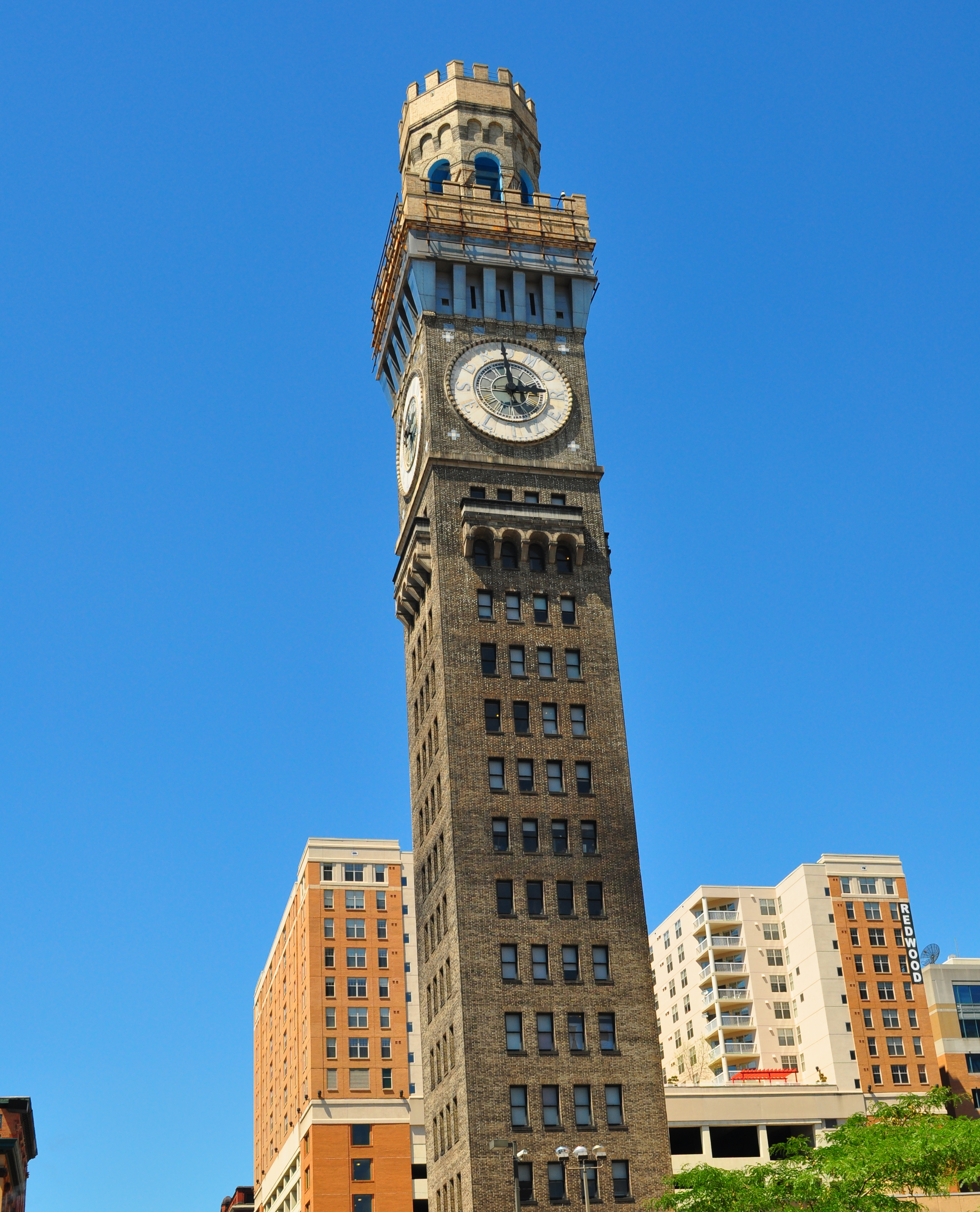
The Emerson Bromo-Seltzer Tower was the tallest building in Baltimore from 1911 until 1923.

This lists buildings that once held the title of tallest building in Baltimore.

Name	Image	Street address	Years as tallest	Height ft (m)	Floors	Reference
Fidelity Building		210 North Charles Street	1893–1901	220 (67.2)	15	
One Calvert Plaza		201 East Baltimore Street	1901–1911	250 (76.2)	16	
Emerson Bromo-Seltzer Tower	framelss	312 West Lombard Street	1911–1923	289 (88.1)	15	
Constellation Energy Building (Note: Now known as 39 West Lexington.)		39 West Lexington Street	1916–1923	293 (89.3)	21	
Baltimore Trust Company Building (Note: Now known as the Bank of America Tower. Formerly also known as the NationsBank Building, the Mathieson Building, the O'Sullivan Building and the Maryland National Bank.)		10 Light Street	1924–1973	509 (155.2)	37	
100 Light Street (Note: Formerly known as the Transamerica Tower.)		100 Light Street	1973–present	529 (161.2)	40	

== See also ==
- List of tallest buildings in the Washington metropolitan area
- List of tallest buildings in Washington D.C.
