= Harry Crawford =

Harry Crawford may also refer to:

- Harry Crawford (politician) (born 1952), American politician in Alaska
- Harry Crawford (footballer) (born 1991), English footballer
- Harry Crawford, character in the TV series Boon
- Harry Leo Crawford (Eugenia Falleni), a transgender man convicted of murder

== See also ==
- Henry Crawford (disambiguation)
- Harold Crawford (disambiguation)
- Harry Crawford Black (1887–1956), American businessperson, newspaper executive and philanthropist
