= 300 East Pratt Street =

Mixed-use building in Baltimore, Maryland

Coordinates: 39.2866°N 76.6109°W

- Interactive map of the 300 East Pratt Street area

General information
- Status: On hold
- Type: Mixed-use
- Location: Baltimore, Maryland, United States
- Estimated completion: Late 2020s

Height
- Height: 640 ft

Technical details
- Floor count: 40

Design and construction
- Developer: MCB Real Estate

300 East Pratt Street is a high-rise building located in Baltimore, Maryland between Commerce and South streets, on what was once the location of the Baltimore News-American building. It sits along the north side of Pratt Street, almost directly north of the Baltimore World Trade Center. It has been vacant and used for a parking lot for decades. However, parking lot owner InterPark LLC purchased the site in August 2013 after a redevelopment plan proposed by Urban America LP in 2006 fell apart during the recession.

== History ==
A proposed building, originally expected to rise to 640 feet (200 m), is currently on hold due to high vacancy rates in the city. Construction of the building was to begin in 2007 and was originally expected to be completed in 2010. The construction of this building was proposed in 2003, but not approved by the state of Maryland. In 2006, the construction of the building was again proposed, and finally approved by the state of Maryland. Plans were scaled back to 40 stories and 300,000 square feet of office space, in addition to a 270-room hotel. As of January 2022, InterPark had a joint venture proposed with Baltimore-based MCB Real Estate to develop the property. The plan for 300 E. Pratt St consolidates with the Harborplace Redevelopment project.

The property, which has been used as a parking lot since the News American building was razed in 1990. The property has gone through two previous owners, and plans were floated for offices, hotels and condominiums but never realized. Then in 2013, InterPark, a Chicago-based developer and parking garage operator, bought the site for $16.4 million and requested bids from developers. Chicago-based InterPark Holdings tapped Comstock Partners in 2014 as a development partner on the project, and Comstock started working with the firm. However, Comstock stepped away from the project around the beginning of that year. The project was expected to break ground in 2016.

== Construction architecture ==
The proposal for 300 E. Pratt St. from InterPark LLC and Comstock Partners called for a building that would rise at least 38 stories, or about 425 feet, making it among the tallest in the city. It was to include a hotel with 200 rooms, about 400 apartments, at least 500 parking spaces and up to 20,000 square feet of retail space. The apartments were to have been a mix of one, two and three-bedroom units with their own lobby, separate from the hotel. There were concerns from the panel members that the building — which would have devoted much of its first floor to parking, service and mechanical uses with retail on Pratt Street — would contribute to the disconnect between the central business district and the Inner Harbor. In order to meet new flood-plain requirements that the building's entrances be 8 feet off the ground in case of flooding during a major storm, Comstock Partners had to shrink the project's footprint, sacrificing about 10,000 square feet of retail space. Designers made the steps lower, wider and terraced, leaving wide stoops that invited pedestrians to sit and look out on Pratt Street.

== See also ==
- List of tallest buildings in Baltimore
