= 250 West Pratt Street =

Highrise building in Baltimore, Maryland

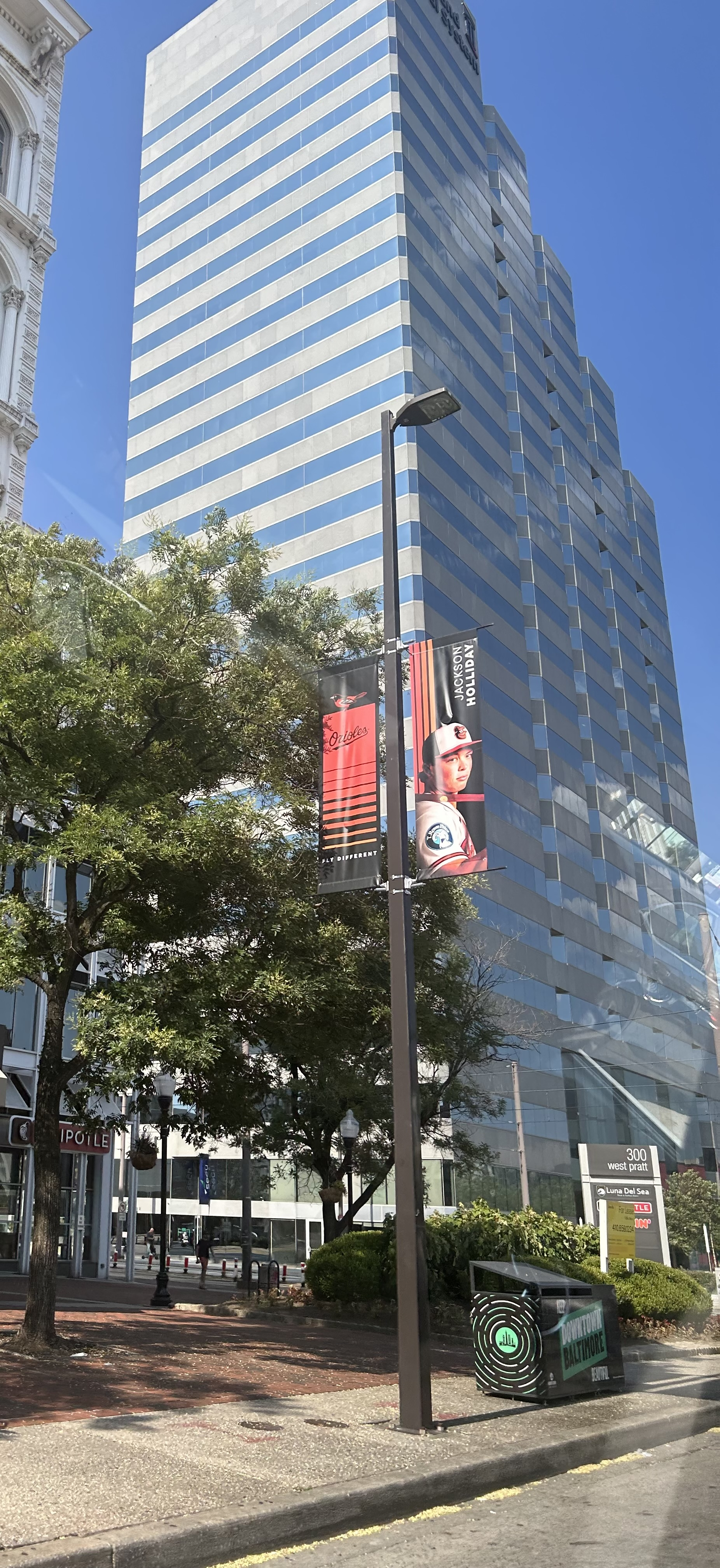
- Exterior view (July 2026)
- Interactive map of the 250 West Pratt Street area

General information
- Status: Completed
- Type: Office/Business
- Location: Baltimore, Maryland, United States
- Coordinates: 39.2867°N 76.6188°W
- Opening: 1986; 40 years ago

Height
- Roof: 360 ft (110 m)

Technical details
- Floor count: 24

Design and construction
- Architect: Skidmore, Owings & Merrill LLP

250 West Pratt Street is a highrise building located in Baltimore, Maryland. The building stands at 360 feet (110 meters), containing 24 floors. The building was constructed and completed in 1986, designed by Skidmore, Owings and Merrill LLP., and originally developed by and for Cabot, Cabot & Forbes. The building is located in the center of Baltimore's central commercial district, and is one of the buildings most visible from Oriole Park at Camden Yards.

In early 2015 Danish jewelry maker Pandora Jewelry moved 600 employees and its regional headquarters for the Americas to the building. As part of a ten-year lease, the company's logo will be added to the building, visible from the street and from Camden Yards.

In May 2023, the law firm Semmes, Bowen & Semmes, P.C. took over two floors of the building for the first time since the Firm moved locations in 2008 after having been some of the building's original tenants. The Firm now occupies a significant portion of Pandora Jewelry's former Americas headquarters.

== See also ==
- List of tallest buildings in Baltimore
