= Fidelity Building (Baltimore) =

Fidelity & Deposit Building
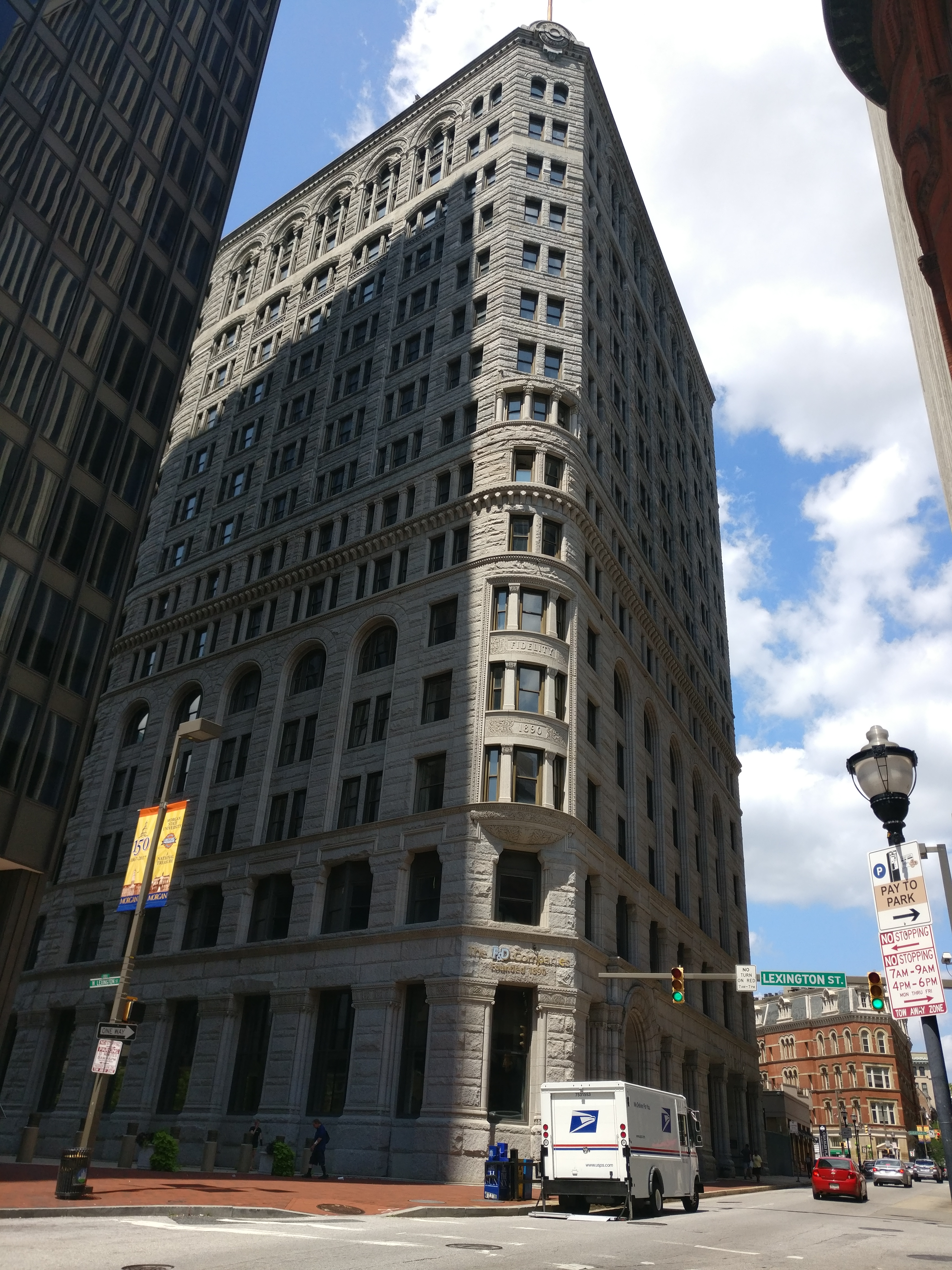
- Interactive map of the Fidelity & Deposit Building area
- Former names: Fidelity and Deposit Company of Baltimore; Colonial American Casualty and Surety Co.

General information
- Status: Under Renovation
- Type: Formerly: Commercial offices Upcoming: Mixed Use Multi-Family
- Architectural style: Romanesque Revival
- Location: 210 North Charles Street at West Lexington Street; Baltimore, Maryland (later edge of Charles Center)
- Coordinates: 39.29135°N 76.61544°W
- Completed: 1894, additional upper floors, 1912–1915
- Owner: Trademark Properties

Height
- Antenna spire: 67 m (220 ft)
- Roof: 62 m (203 ft)

Technical details
- Floor count: 15

Design and construction
- Architects: Baldwin & Pennington, Ephraim Francis Baldwin, (1837–1916), and Josias Pennington, (1854–1929)

The Fidelity Building is a 15-story, 67 m (220 ft) high rise building in the central business district of Baltimore, Maryland. Completed in 1894, it was later the headquarters of the Fidelity and Deposit Company of Baltimore which was founded in 1892. As of 2024, the building is currently being converted into 220-unit mixed use apartments with ground level retail.

== Overview and history ==
Located at the rise of Cathedral Hill at the northwest corner of North Charles Street and West Lexington Street on the eastern edge of the city's main live and movie theatre district along West Lexington and the department store/retail shopping area focused several blocks west at Howard and Lexington Streets. It also is situated at the south end of the tony Victorian-era residential townhouses and mansions of the neighborhood of Mount Vernon-Belvedere, centered by the landmark Washington Monument several blocks north, visible from the F. & D.'s front doors. The building's architectural style is Romanesque Revival. The building designed by the prominent local architectural firm of Baldwin & Pennington, composed of leading regional designers, Ephraim Francis Baldwin, (1837–1916) and Josias Pennington, (1854–1929) - main "house architects" for stations and structures of the dominant Baltimore and Ohio Railroad. B. & P. used steel cage framing construction with a grey, rough-cut granite facing. The original roof had French dormers and mansard roof (evoking French Second Empire styling and a southeast corner cupola/tower.

The building was used for business by Fidelity. The building originally contained eight floors with a façade of grey granite, with a corner cupola tower and mansard roof. It stood on the northwestern edge of the famous "burnt district" of the February 1904 Great Baltimore Fire which destroyed numerous downtown and waterfront buildings and skyscrapers up to across the street. Following the initial reconstruction phase of 1905–1910, when several recently built downtown towers were burned out, but their steel skeletons and concrete foundations/floors and floors survived structurally sound and were rebuilt with new interiors and masonry facades. So F. & D. under the leadership of founder and president Edwin Warfield, (1848–1920), former 45th governor of Maryland, made arrangements between 1912 and 1915, reflecting the continued growth of the company, to add seven additional floor to the building, increasing the number of floors to fifteen, with the upper storied covered with a surface of terra-cotta, matching the style of the original architecture below.

In 1962, One Charles Center was constructed next to the Fidelity Building.

== 2020s multi-family and mixed-use conversion project ==
In 2022, Trademark Properties acquired the now-vacant property for $6,000,000. The building had last been used at the turn of the century, but has since sat unoccupied. In mid-2023, permits began getting pulled for interior pre-renovation demolition. Fences were erected around the exterior of the building along Charles St, and an external lift and trash chute was installed. As of February 2024, permits for interior renovation have been obtained, and work is now progressing on converting the building into a multi-family mixed use property. The permits are valid until 2026. Initial estimates for completion pegged opening of the new 220-unit apartment building for Spring 2024. As interior renovation permits were pulled February 2024, it is likely that this completion date will be pushed back. Plans initially call for a mix of studio, one and two-bedroom units, from 500 to 2000 sq ft, with a restaurant with outdoor seating, and two-to-three retail shells for shops on the ground floor.

== See also ==
- List of tallest buildings in Baltimore
