= 25 South Charles =

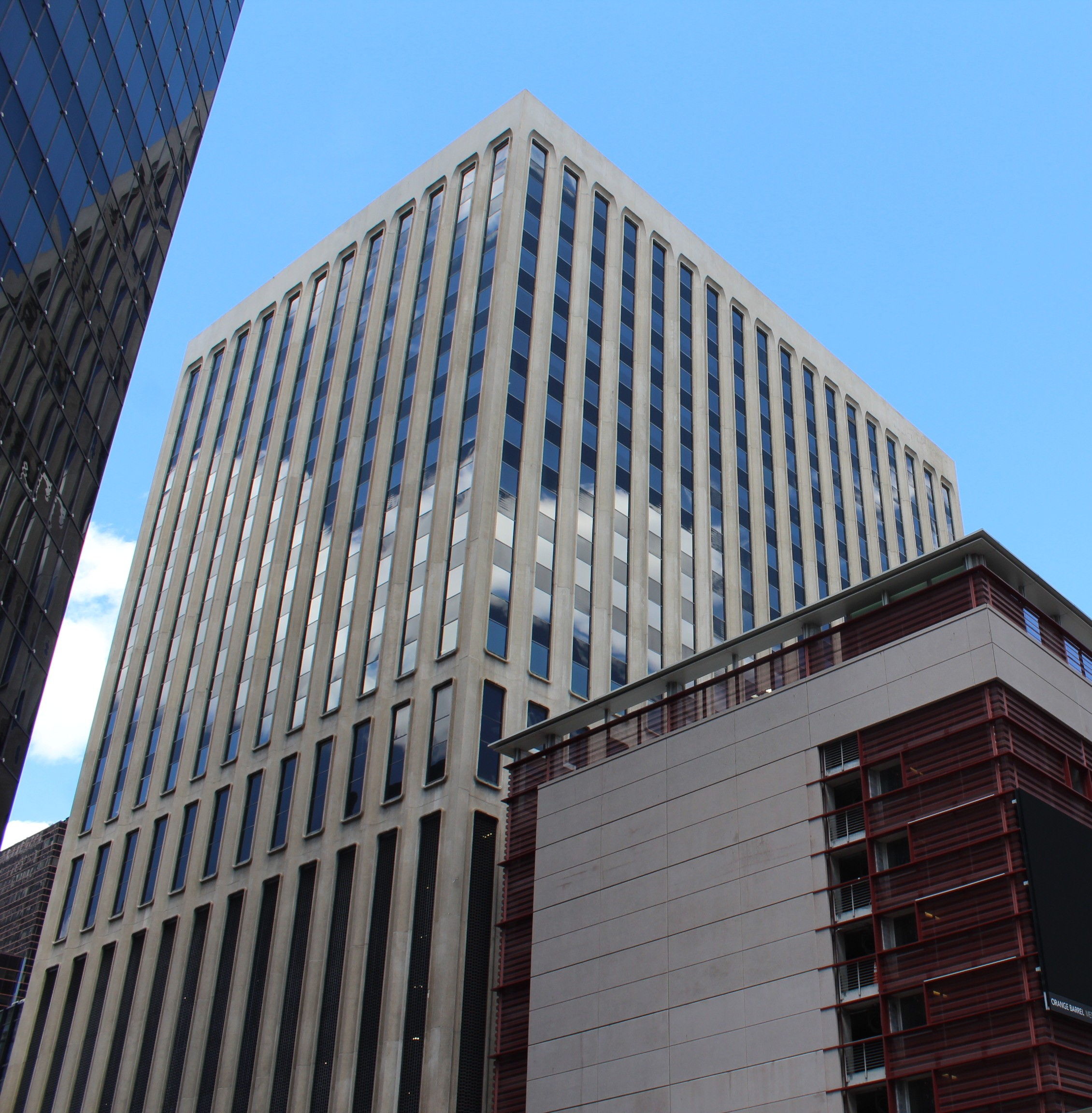
- 25 South Charles in 2025
- Interactive map of the 25 South Charles area

General information
- Type: Office
- Location: 25 South Charles Street, Baltimore, Maryland, United States
- Coordinates: 39°17′18″N 76°36′51.5″W
- Completed: 1972
- Opening: 1972

Height
- Roof: 315 ft (96 m)

Technical details
- Floor count: 22

25 South Charles, formerly the M&T Bank Building, the First Maryland Building, and the First National Bank Of Maryland, is a commercial high-rise in Baltimore, Maryland. The building rises 22 floors and 315 feet (96 m) in height, and is currently tied with the Mercantile Bank & Trust Company Building as the 19th-tallest structure in the city. The structure was completed in 1972. 25 South Charles Building is an example of modern architecture. The building currently houses offices for the M&T Bank Corporation.

== See also ==
- List of tallest buildings in Baltimore
