= HarborView Condominium =

Residential high rise in Baltimore, Maryland

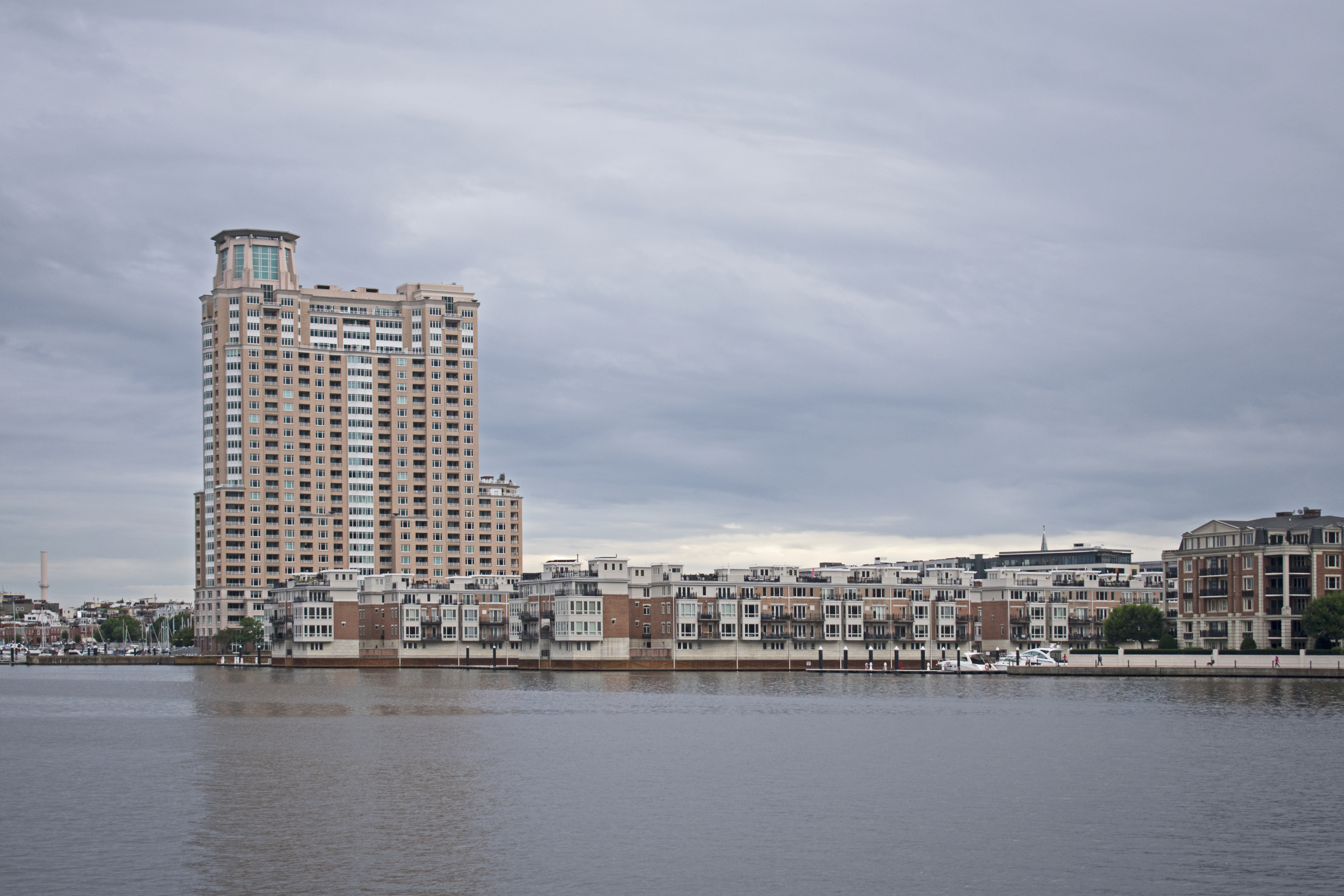
- Interactive map of the HarborView Condominium area

General information
- Type: Residential
- Location: 100 Harborview Drive, Baltimore, Maryland, United States
- Coordinates: 39°16′38″N 76°36′16″W
- Completed: 1993
- Opening: 1993

Height
- Roof: 342 ft (104 m)

Technical details
- Floor count: 29

Design and construction
- Architects: SHK3 Architectural Interdesign, LLC; Design Collective, Inc.
- Developer: TRACO
- Structural engineer: SK&A Structural Engineers, PLLC, Froehling & Robertson, Inc., Mueser Rutledge Consulting Engineers, Mueser Rutledge Consulting Engineers
- Main contractor: Kajima International, Inc.

HarborView Condominium is a residential high-rise in Baltimore, Maryland, United States. The building, which is a part of the HarborView complex, rises 29 floors and 342 feet (104 m) in height, and stands as the 16th-tallest building in the city. Originally approved in 1990, the structure was completed in 1993 and was built on the site of the old Bethlehem Steel Shipyards graving dock which was demolished in 1983. HarborView Condominium was designed by architectural firms Design Collective, Inc. and SHK3 Architectural Interdesign.

The HarborView complex was originally planned to include two additional 26-story residential towers. However, as the complex is located on the Inner Harbor waterfront, the plan received much criticism for its potential to block views of the harbor. The proposal for the two additional towers was eventually blocked by Baltimore Mayor Sheila Dixon in August 2007. However, the structures were then redesigned, and a new proposal for a 17-story Pinnacle at HarborView has received construction approval from the city. A redesign of the third building in the complex, HarborView Phase 3, has yet to receive city approval. In 2020, the property was listed with a value of $6,000,000.

== See also ==
- List of tallest buildings in Baltimore
