= Baltimore Marriott Waterfront Hotel =

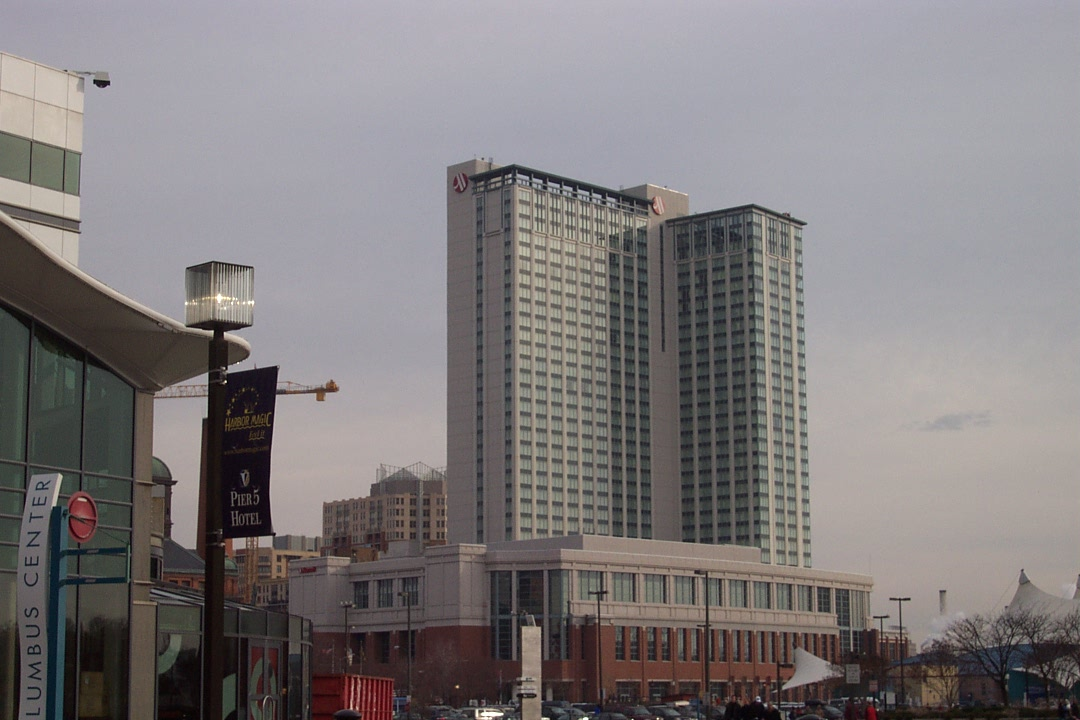
- Interactive map of the Baltimore Marriott Waterfront Hotel area

General information
- Status: Completed, Open
- Type: Hotel
- Location: Baltimore, Maryland, United States
- Coordinates: 39°17′0.7″N 76°36′10.7″W

Height
- Height: 360 ft (110 m)

Technical details
- Floor count: 32

Design and construction
- Developer: Beatty Harvey Fillat Architects

Baltimore Marriott Waterfront Hotel is a high-rise hotel building, located in the Harbor East area of Baltimore, Maryland. The hotel is situated at 700 Aliceanna St. Primarily a convention hotel, the property has 32 floors with over 750 rooms, standing at 360 feet (110 m). The hotel has been the tallest hotel structure in Baltimore since it opened in 2001 as one of the first structures in Harbor East. The construction of the building was completed in 2001 by the developers of Beatty Harvey Fillat Architects. Beginning on November 16, 2007, management of the hotel began renovations of the building's rooms, which ended on May 25, 2008.

== See also ==
- List of tallest buildings in Baltimore
