= Wells Fargo Tower (Baltimore) =

Commercial skyscraper in Baltimore, Maryland

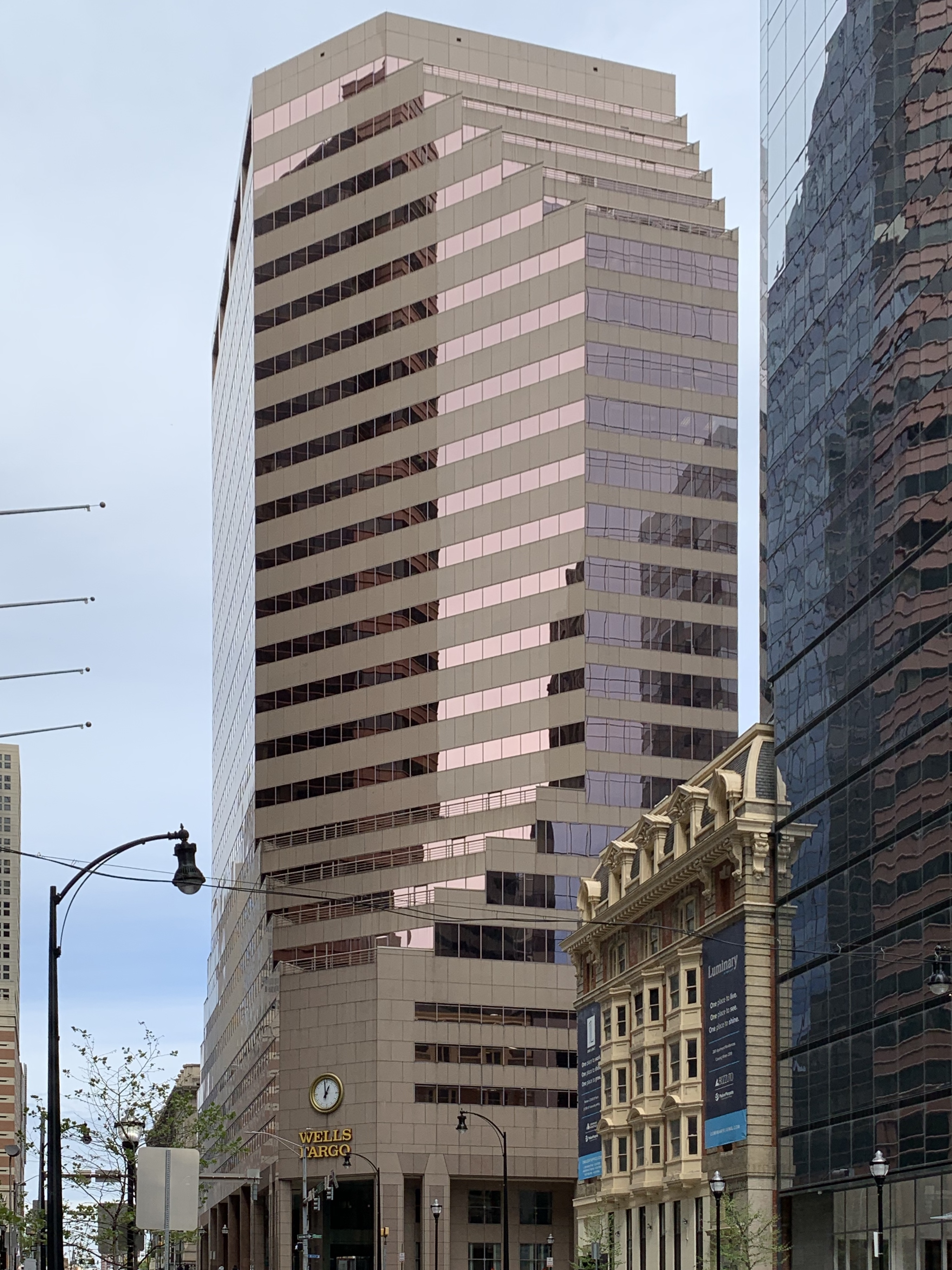
- Interactive map of the Wells Fargo Tower area

General information
- Type: Office
- Location: 7 Saint Paul Street, Baltimore, Maryland, United States
- Coordinates: 39°17′24″N 76°36′49″W
- Completed: 1985
- Opening: 1985
- Owner: Wells Fargo

Height
- Roof: 330 ft (100 m)

Technical details
- Floor count: 24

Design and construction
- Developer: Trammell Crow, Harbor Group International

The Wells Fargo Tower, formerly known as the First Union Signet Tower, Wachovia Tower, and Union Trust Building, is a commercial high-rise in Baltimore, Maryland. The building rises 24 floors above street level and is 330 feet (101 m) in height; it is tied with Charles Center South as the 17th-tallest building in the city. The structure was completed in 1985. The Wells Fargo Tower was developed by the Dallas-based Trammell Crow Company, and is currently owned by the Wells Fargo and Company. The structure is an example of modern architecture, and has a glass, steel and concrete façade. The Wachovia Tower rises from the site formerly occupied by the Calvert Building and 7-9 Saint Paul Street. The building, formerly housing offices for Wachovia, is now home to the regional office of Wells Fargo and Company.

== See also ==
- List of tallest buildings in Baltimore
