= Vue Harbor East =

High-rise hotel and Condo building in Baltimore, US

The Vue Harbor East
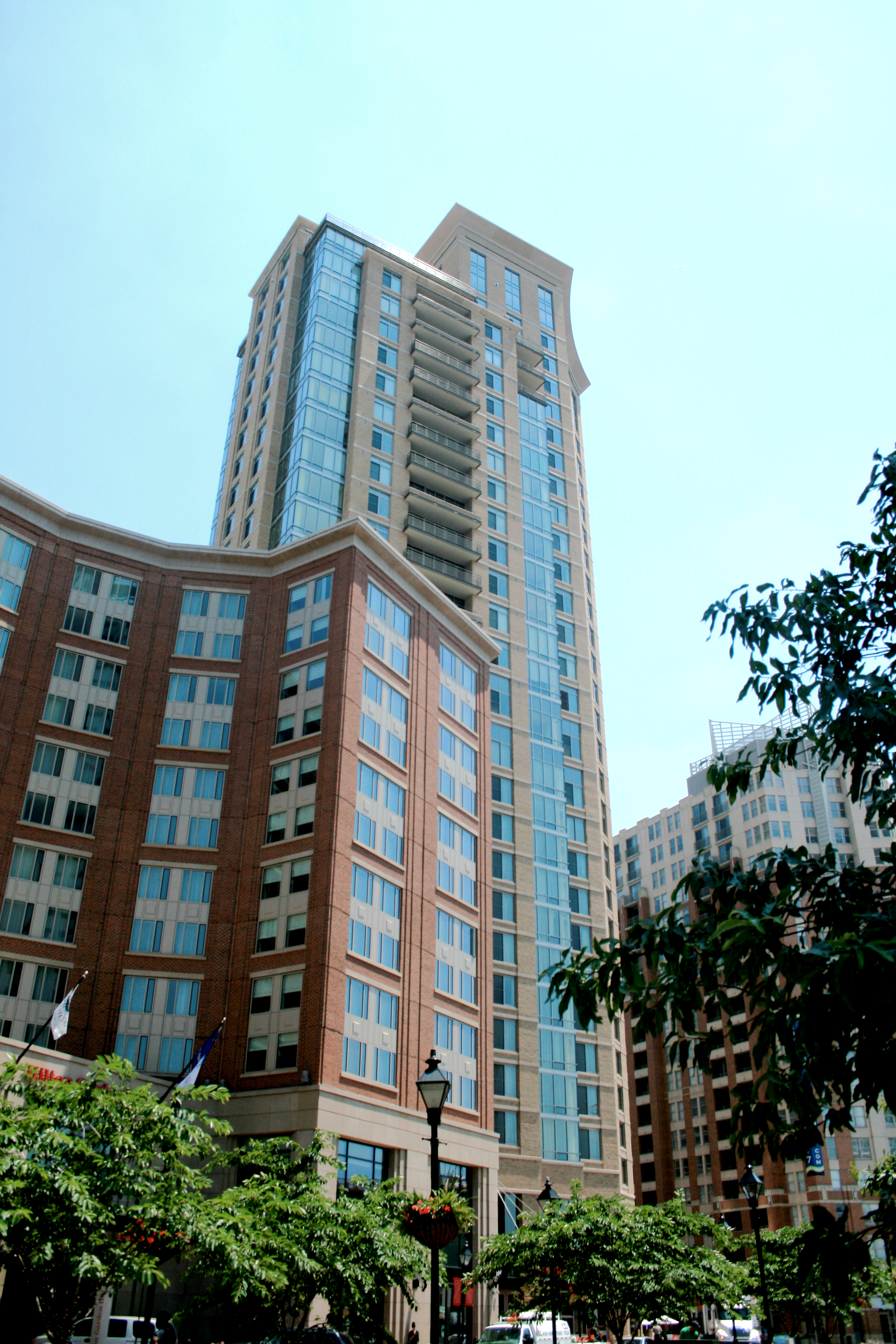

General information
- Status: Completed
- Type: Mixed-Use
- Location: 675 South President Street, Baltimore, Maryland, United States
- Coordinates: 39°17′0.4″N 76°36′4.5″W
- Construction started: 2005
- Completed: 2007

Height
- Height: 306 ft.

Technical details
- Floor count: 30

Design and construction
- Developer: Beatty Harvey Fillat Architects

Vue Harbor East is a high-rise hotel and condominium building located in Baltimore, Maryland, United States. The condo portion of the building rises 306 feet (93 m), with the hotel portion rising to a lower height and containing 131 rooms. The construction of the building began in 2005 and was completed in 2007. The building was designed by Beatty Harvey Fillat Architects. The larger mixed use scheme at Parcel B known as Harbor East was developed by H&S Properties Development Corp. and Struever Bros. Eccles & Rouse.

The construction of this building was a part of the building span that took place in Harbor East, Baltimore. Currently the Vue offers 30 floors and 123 residences. The Harbor East mixed-use development includes two paired Hilton-branded hotels: the Hilton Garden Inn Baltimore Inner Harbor and the Homewood Suites by Hilton Baltimore. There is a seven screen cinema located inside the Harbour East development complex of Aliceanna and President streets. It opened in November 2007 and was originally managed by Los Angeles based Landmark Theatres. After closing due to the impact of the pandemic it was renamed in 2021 to Harbour East Cinemas and is now run by Flagship Premium Cinemas.

== See also ==
- List of tallest buildings in Baltimore
