= 201 North Charles Street Building =

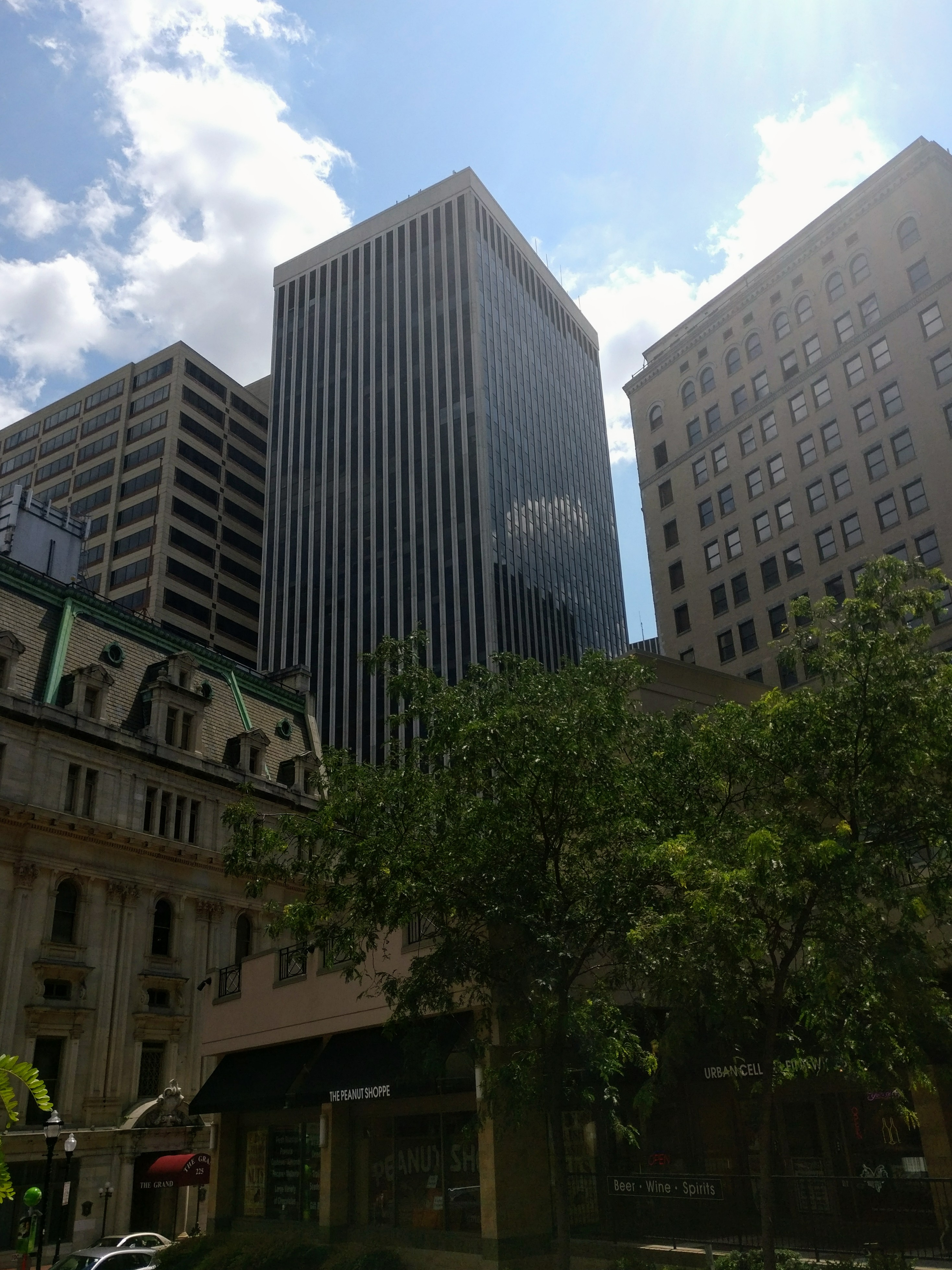
- Interactive map of the 201 North Charles Street Building area

General information
- Status: Completed
- Type: Office
- Location: 201 North Charles Street, Baltimore, Maryland, United States
- Coordinates: 39°17′28.8″N 76°36′54″W
- Completed: 1967
- Opening: 1967

Height
- Roof: 350 ft (110 m)

Technical details
- Floor count: 28

201 North Charles Street Building is a high-rise office building located at 201 North Charles Street in Baltimore, Maryland. The building rises 28 floors and 350 feet (107 m) in height, and is tied with 4 other buildings as the 16th-tallest building in the city. The structure was completed in 1967, and is an example of international architecture.

== See also ==
- List of tallest buildings in Baltimore
