= Towers at Harbor Court =

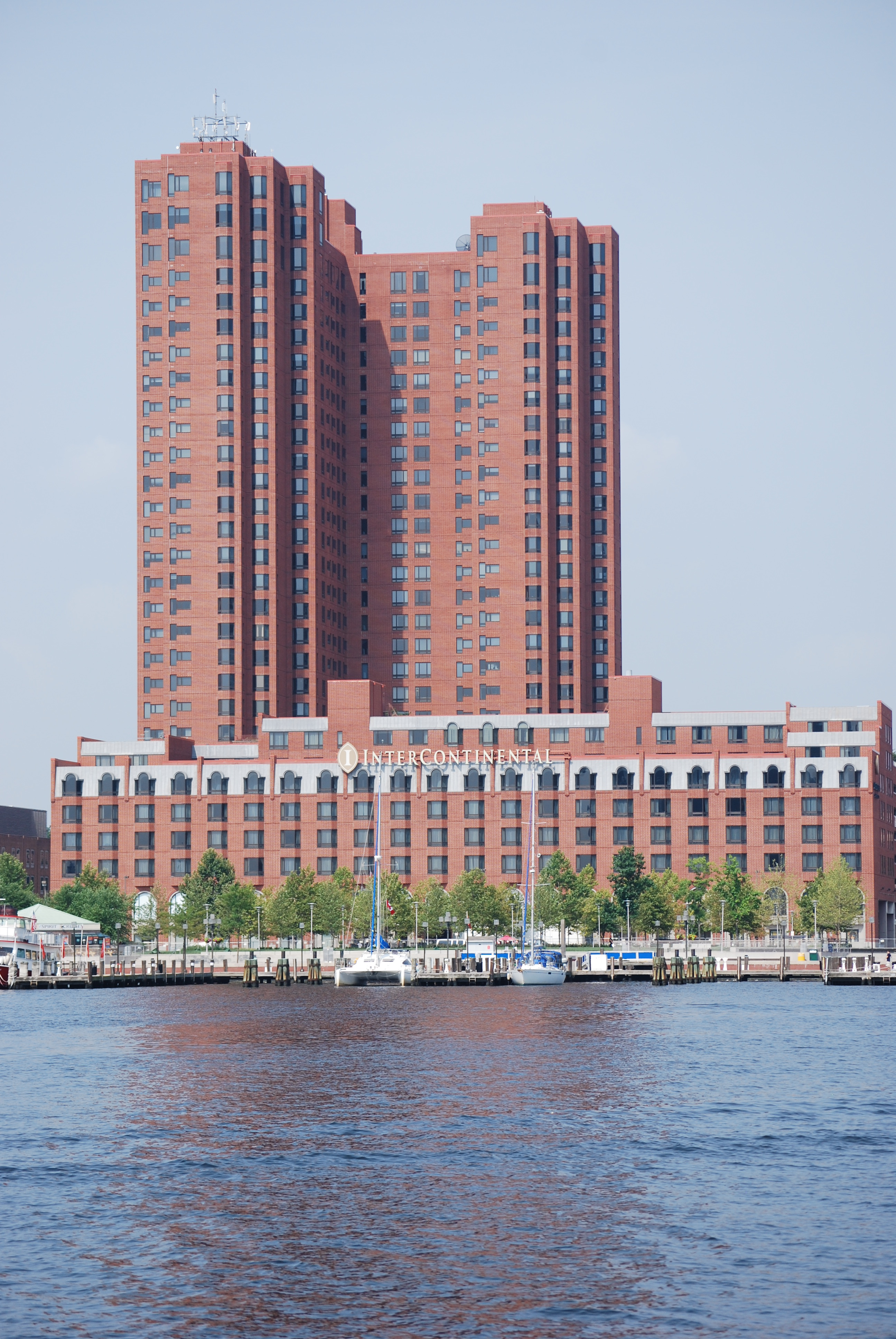
- Interactive map of the Towers at Harbor Court area

General information
- Type: Residential
- Location: 10 East Lee Street, Baltimore, Maryland, United States
- Coordinates: 39°16′57″N 76°36′52″W
- Completed: 1987
- Opening: 1987

Height
- Roof: 356 ft (109 m)

Technical details
- Floor count: 28

Design and construction
- Developer: Allied Roofing and Sheetmetal, Inc.
- Main contractor: Peter Kewitt Contractors

The Towers at Harbor Court is a residential high-rise complex in Baltimore, Maryland. The building rises 28 floors and 356 feet (109 m) in height, and stands as the 14th-tallest building in the city. The structure was completed in 1987. The Towers at Harbor Court complex was developed by Allied Roofing and Sheetmetal, Inc.; the structure is an example of modern architecture. The structure consists entirely of residential condominiums.

== See also ==
- List of tallest buildings in Baltimore
