= One North Charles =

High-rise building in Baltimore, Maryland

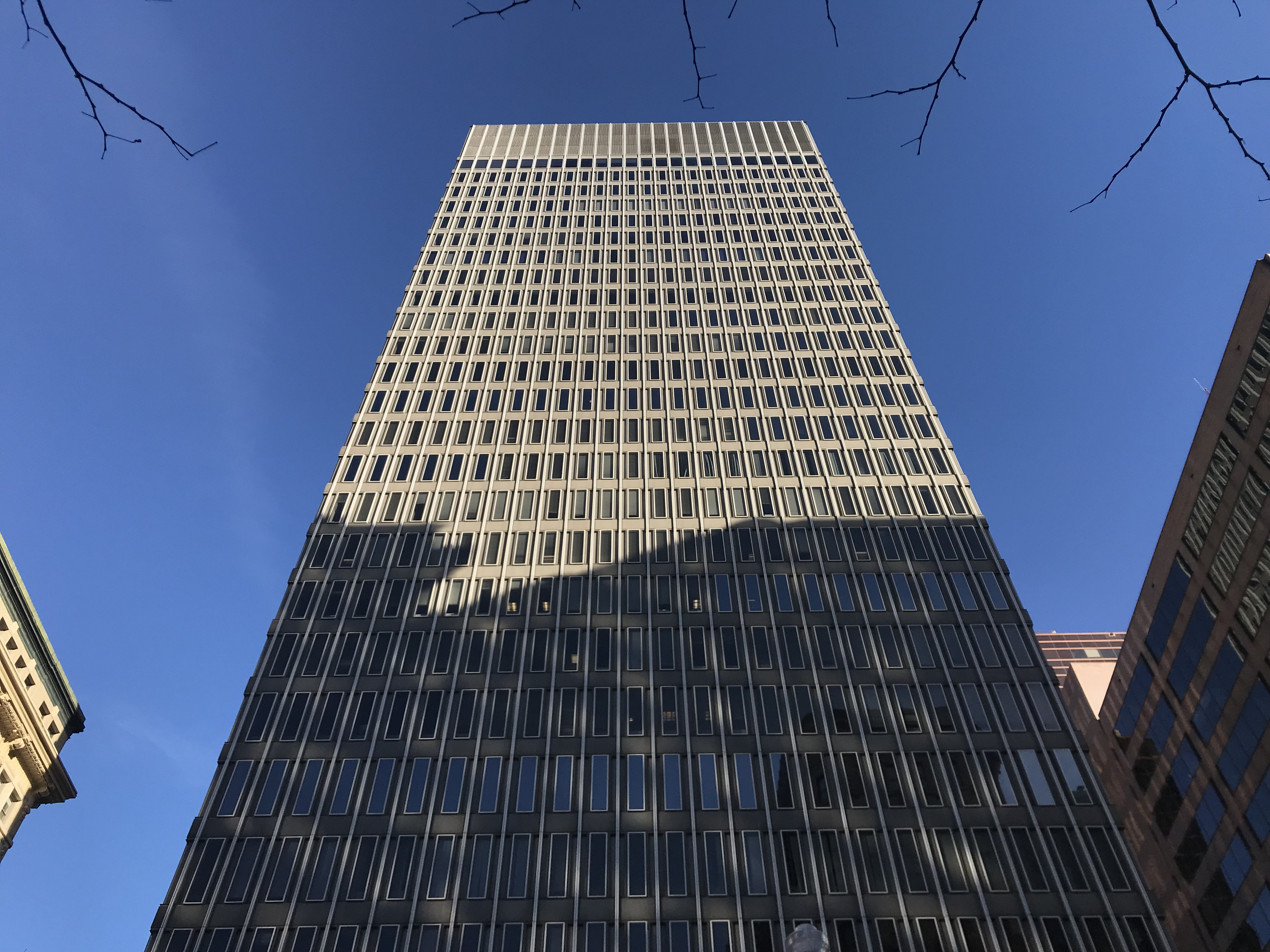
- Interactive map of the One North Charles area

General information
- Status: Completed
- Type: Office/Business
- Location: Baltimore, Maryland, United States
- Coordinates: 39.290127°N 76.614879°W
- Completed: 1962

Height
- Height: 360 ft (110 m)

Technical details
- Floor count: 30

Design and construction
- Developer: Vincent Kling & Associates

One North Charles, formerly known as The Blaustein Building, is a highrise building located in Baltimore, Maryland, United States. The building stands at 360 feet (110 m), containing 30 floors. The building was constructed in 1962, and was developed by Vincent Kling & Associates. The Hub Department Store was destroyed in order for this building to be built. The Blaustein Building was constructed for the Blaustein family, to move into a larger headquarters for their growing businesses. The family sold the building in 1997. Corinthian Realty Partners LLC of Bethesda acquired the firm for the building in 2005 for US$10 million.

The building changed hands again in 2017 for $8.725 m to Northern Capital of New England. The building was later re-branded as One North Charles, the technical address of the tower, and remains branded as such as of September 2023.

== See also ==
- List of tallest buildings in Baltimore
