= Harold Crawford =

Harold Crawford may refer to:

- Harold Crawford (footballer), see Hugh McDonald (footballer)
- Harold Crawford (architect), (1888–1981) American architect

== See also ==
- Harry Crawford (disambiguation)
