= Commerce Place (Baltimore) =

Coordinates: 39°17′21.6″N 76°36′37.6″W

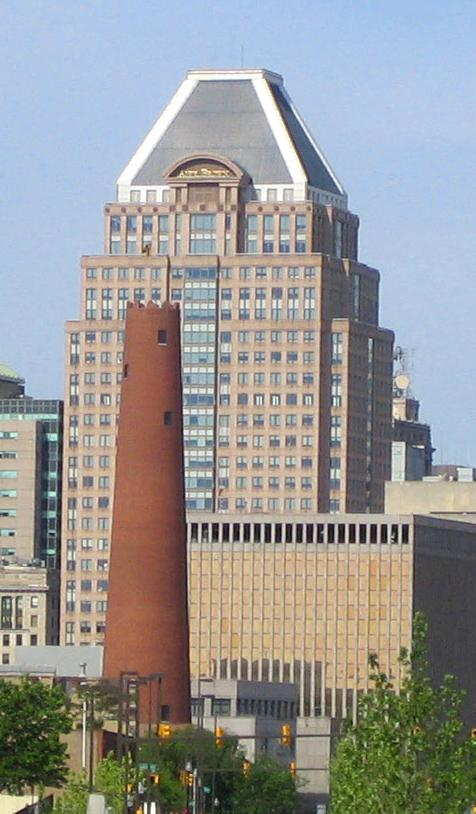
- Commerce Place with the Phoenix Shot Tower in the foreground
- Interactive map of the Commerce Place area

General information
- Type: Office
- Location: 1 South Street, Baltimore, Maryland, United States
- Completed: 1992
- Opening: 1992

Height
- Roof: 454 ft (138 m)

Technical details
- Floor count: 31

Commerce Place is a high-rise in Baltimore, Maryland. The building rises 31 floors and 454 feet (138 m) in height, and stands as the fifth-tallest building in the city. The structure was completed in 1992. Commerce Place's project architect and lead designer was architect Geraldine Pontius of RTKL Associates, a Baltimore-based architectural and engineering firm; the structure is an example of Postmodern architecture. 23 of the building's 31 floors are used for commercial offices, while six are used for parking. The remaining two floors are used as retail space.

== See also ==
- List of tallest buildings in Baltimore
