= William Donald Schaefer Building =

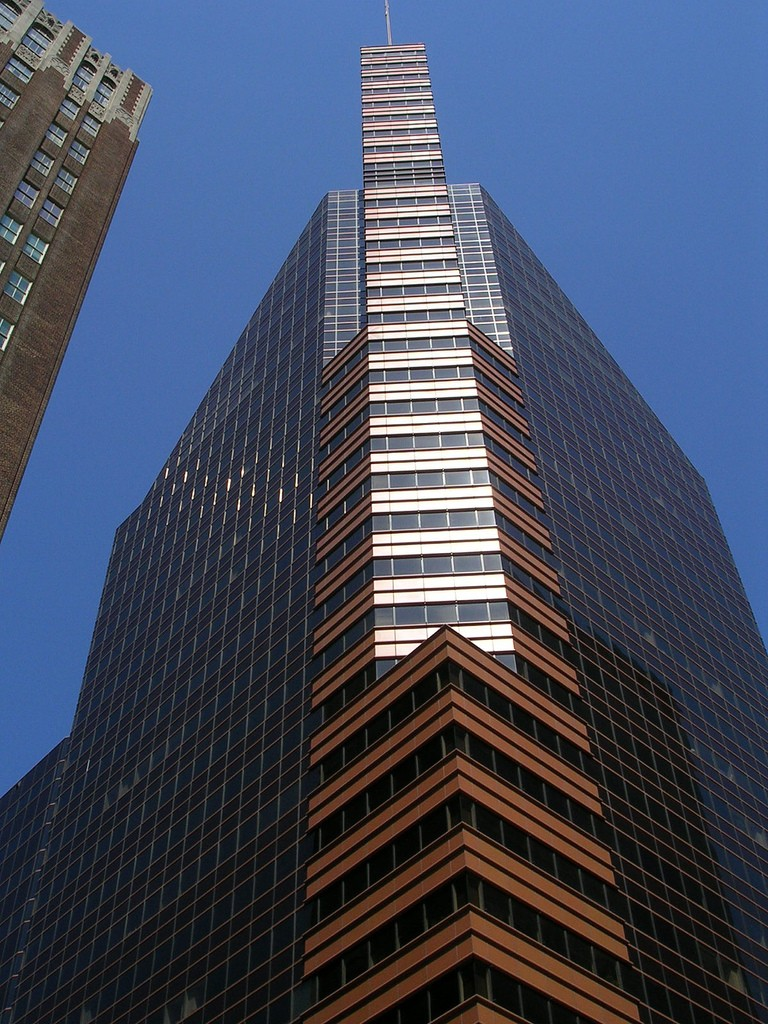
- The William Donald Schaefer Building is the fourth-tallest building in Baltimore.

General information
- Location: 6 St. Paul St (northwest corner, E Baltimore St and St. Paul Street), Baltimore, Maryland, US
- Coordinates: 39.2898°N 76.6141°W
- Completed: 1986
- Opening: 1992

Height
- Antenna spire: 590 ft (180 m)
- Roof: 493 ft (150 m)

Technical details
- Floor count: 37
- Floor area: 305,394 sq ft (28,372.0 m^{2})

Design and construction
- Developer: Maryland Department of General Services

The William Donald Schaefer Building (a.k.a. William Donald Schaefer Tower or simply Schaefer Tower, previously known as Merritt Tower) is the fourth-tallest building in the City of Baltimore, Maryland, located at 6 St. Paul Street. Originally completed by Merritt Savings and Loan in 1986 and later re-opened under state management in 1992, the building rises 37 floors and 493 feet (150 m) in height. Office space constitutes the lower 29 floors, housing more than 1,100 employees in 14 state agencies. The nine upper floors are unoccupied, containing a maintenance area, cement staircase, a ladder to the rooftop deck and then an eight-floor spiral staircase leading to the top of the spire and the flagpole.

The flagpole atop the building reaches to 590 feet (180 m), higher than any building in the state. The flags flown from the tower's poles are (by order of former Governor Martin O'Malley) a large and noticeable Star-Spangled Banner flag (a recreation of that flown over Fort McHenry during the War of 1812); and a smaller Maryland state flag. Both are usually clearly visible throughout the downtown area and most of the city.

The iconic building was renamed for William Donald Schaefer (1921–2011), who served as the Mayor of Baltimore (1971–1987), Governor of Maryland (1987–1995), and state comptroller (1999–2007).

== History ==
The Merritt Commercial Savings and Loan Association, originally from Merritt Boulevard in the southeast Baltimore County suburban area of Dundalk, was one of several savings and loan associations (S&Ls) which had experienced rapid growth in deposits in the late 1970s and early 1980s. To invest a portion of this capital and increase its prestige, Merritt S&L constructed the Merritt Tower to replace its small brick offices on the west side of St. Paul Street just above East Baltimore Street. The new building would also overshadow the headquarters of rival Baltimore Federal S&L, a recreated Georgian/Federal-style building known as "Colonial Corner" which had dominated St. Paul Street since the 1950s, and the headquarters of many of the traditional larger banks and insurance companies which had dominated the city's skyline since the Great Baltimore Fire of 1904.

The Merritt Association went bankrupt along with several other major S&Ls in the metropolitan area during the aftermath of the Old Court Savings and Loans financial embezzlement scandals, following a run on its deposits in 1985. The Merritt Tower was sold at auction for US$30 million.

After a succession of owners, the Maryland state Department of General Services purchased the building from Chemical Bank of New York for US$12.2 million, which was less than half of the building's estimated cost, and eventually planned to use it for supplemental center-city state offices in addition to the long-time "State Office Building Complex" (formerly known as the Mount Royal Plaza). It was renamed for William Donald Schaefer who served as city mayor (1971–1987) and state governor (1987–1995).

On March 24, 2025, the state of Maryland announced that the building is on the market and that state offices will relocate to other state facilities or leased offices.

== Building characteristics ==
The building was an immediate landmark for its scale and copper-colored metal-clad roof. The upper floors were designed as a loft apartment with a huge palladian window overlooking the inner harbor. It was to be a "shag pad" for the personal and private use of the developer (the president of Merritt S&L). The floor in front of the window had been scheduled to have a hot tub installed and the upper mezzanine-style half-floors on the left and right sides of the space were to be bedroom areas for his personal entertainment. As of 2008, the now-finished floor is a conference room for the Maryland Transit Administration.

== Tenants ==
The Schaefer Tower houses several state agencies. These include the headquarters of the Maryland Transit Administration, the Board of Contract Appeals (suite 601), the Maryland Governor's Office of Minority Affairs (suite 1502), the Maryland Office of People's Counsel (suite 2102), the Maryland Commission on Civil Rights (suite 900), the Office of the Public Defender (suite 1400), the Maryland Public Service Commission, and the Maryland Teachers & State Employees Supplemental Retirement Plans system (suite 200). It also houses branch offices of the Department of Assessments and Taxation, the Department of General Services, an office suite for the Governor of Maryland, the Governor's Office of Health Care Alternative Dispute Resolution, the Governor's Office of Homeland Security, the Department of Health and Mental Hygiene, the Maryland Automobile Insurance Fund, and the Property Tax Assessment Appeal Boards.

== See also ==
- List of tallest buildings in Baltimore
