= Henry Crawford (disambiguation) =

Henry Crawford is a character in Jane Austen's novel, Mansfield Park.

Henry Crawford may also refer to:

- Henry Clay Crawford (1856–1929), American politician
- Homewood Crawford (Sir Henry Homewood Crawford, 1850–1936), English solicitor
- Shag Crawford (Henry Crawford, 1916–2007), American baseball umpire
- Henry O. Crawford (1901–1967), American football and track and field coach

== See also ==
- Harry Crawford (disambiguation)
