= Harry Crawford Black =

American businessman (1887–1956)

Harry Crawford Black (1887–1956) was an American businessperson, newspaper executive, and philanthropist. He was chairman of The A.S. Abell Company, which published the Baltimore Sun newspaper.

He was born in Baltimore in 1887. He graduated from The Boys' Latin School of Baltimore in 1905 and later graduated from Princeton University. Upon graduating from Princeton University, Black took a job with Baltimore’s Fidelity and Deposit Company. He married Constance Hoffmeister in 1912. They had one child, Guy Crawford Black, who died at a very young age.

Black is most known for his work with the Baltimore Sun and The Sunpapers. He also held board positions in the Fidelity and Deposit Company, The Fidelity Trust Company, and The Sunpapers. Harry C. Black died in 1956 at the age of 69, at his home in Boynton Beach, Florida. Harry C. Black was described as an old-fashioned, polite, generous old man. He rode a horse-drawn buggy to his work, and made charitable donations to several Baltimore organizations, such as Johns Hopkins University, the Enoch Pratt Free Library, as well as several local museums.
