= George H. Fallon Federal Office Building =

- Federal Office Building
- U.S. National Register of Historic Places
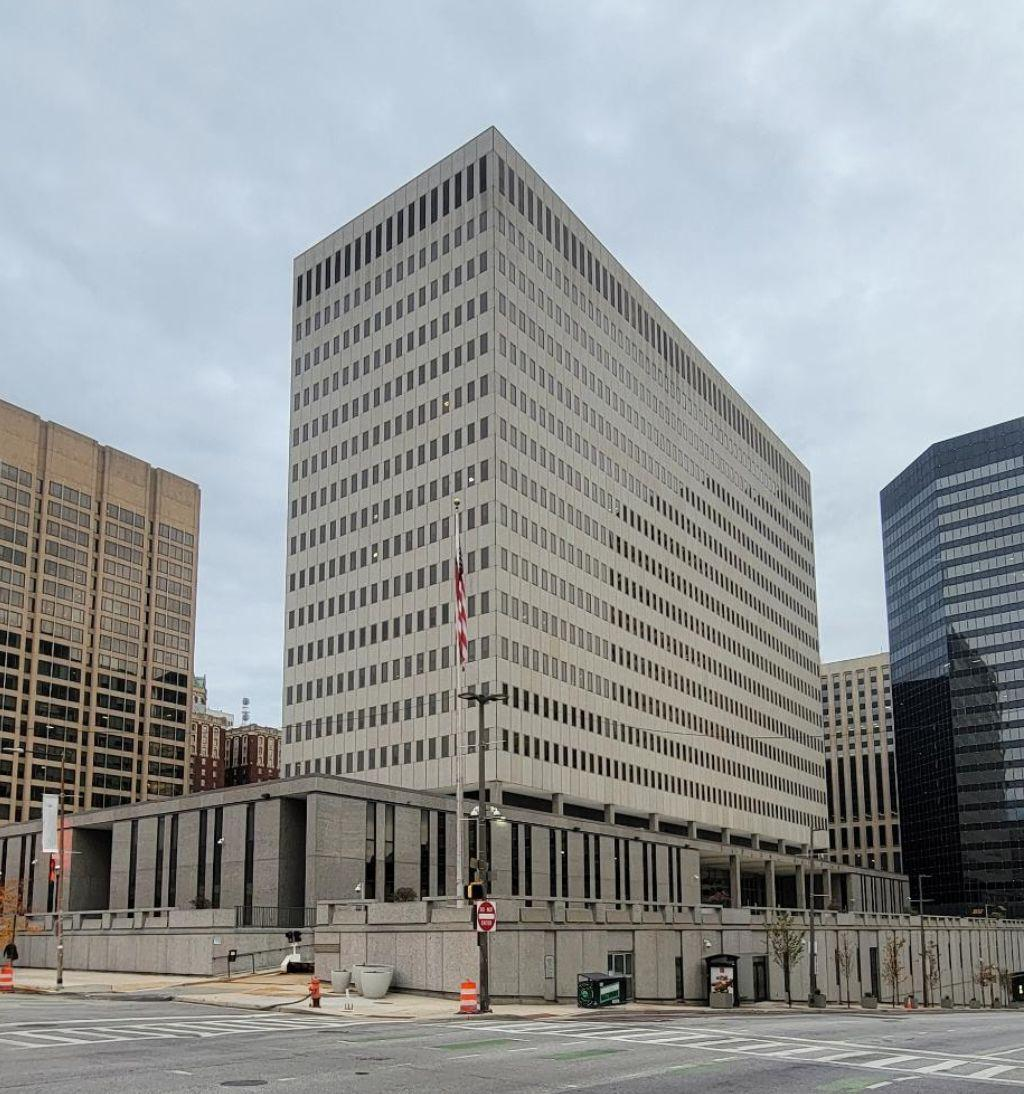
- George H. Fallon Federal Office Building, October 2025

- Location within Baltimore Location within Maryland Location within the United States
- Location: 31 Hopkins Plaza; Baltimore, Maryland
- Coordinates: 39°17′17″N 76°37′03″W
- Area: 2.45 acres (0.99 ha)
- Built: 1963-1967
- Architect: Fisher, Nes, Campbell, and Associates (lead architects)
- Architectural style: International Style
- NRHP reference No.: 100009560
- Added to NRHP: November 15, 2023

George H. Fallon Federal Office Building, is a historic office building located at Baltimore, Maryland, United States. It was built between 1963 and 1967, and is a 17-story, International Style steel frame and reinforced concrete building clad in granite panels from Minnesota. The building was developed by and continues to be managed by the General Services Administration. It was developed as part of Charles Center, a major urban renewal project that was planned and implemented between 1955 and 1975. The building measures 480 feet long by 223 feet wide, and contains over 725,000 gross square feet of space. It houses offices for a number of federal agencies, including the Federal Highway Administration and United States Immigration and Customs Enforcement.

Public Law 91-653 officially designated the building as the "George H. Fallon Federal Office Building" in January 1971, in recognition of Congressman George Hyde Fallon (1902–1980). It was listed on the National Register of Historic Places in 2023.

== Detention of Immigrants ==
In March 2025, it was reported that Office of Enforcement and Removal Operations holding rooms designed to hold five people for hours were being filled with 25 people for days on end. They were being denied medical care and access to medications. Many did not have blankets or mattresses, sleeping on the bare floor. In July 2025, six members of the Maryland congressional delegation were denied access to inspect the detention facility. By February 2026, it was as many as 50 in one cell, without access to showers and only a makeshift bathroom with minimal privacy. A video was leaked showing the conditions of the facility.
