= 100 East Pratt Street =

Office building in Baltimore

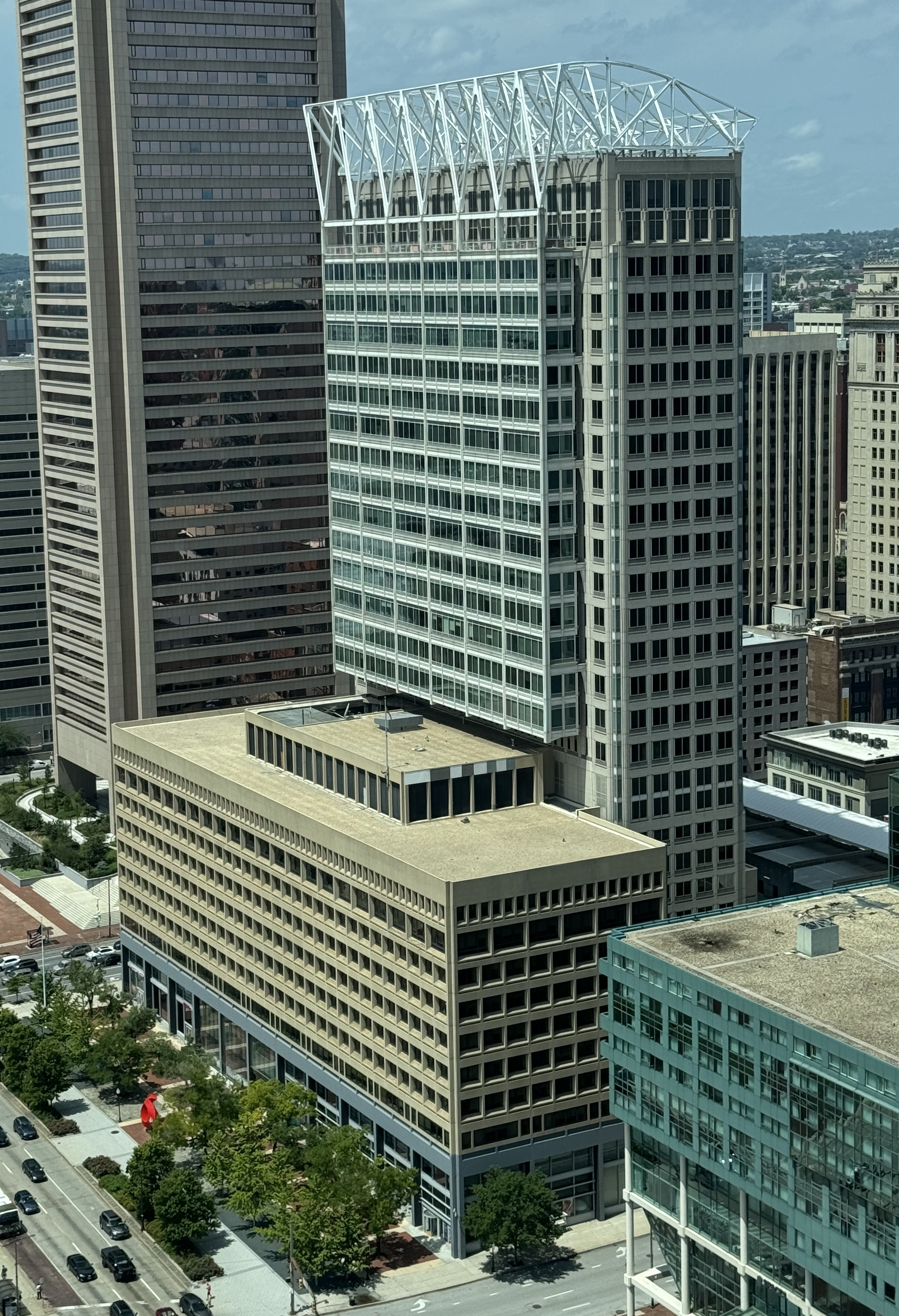
- Interactive map of the 100 East Pratt Street area

General information
- Status: In operation
- Type: Office building
- Location: Baltimore, Maryland, United States
- Completed: 1992
- Opening: 1992

Height
- Antenna spire: 418 ft (127 m)
- Roof: 385 ft (117 m)

Technical details
- Floor count: 28
- Floor area: 635,297 sq ft (59,021.0 m^{2})

Design and construction
- Architect: Skidmore, Owings & Merrill
- Structural engineer: Skidmore, Owings & Merrill LLP
- Main contractor: Manganaro; The Whiting-Turner Contracting Company

100 East Pratt Street is a building located on Pratt Street in the Inner Harbor district of Baltimore, Maryland, that consists of a ten-story concrete building finished in 1975 and a 1991 glass and steel twenty-eight story tower.

== History ==
The original concrete building was designed by Emery Roth & Sons and Pietro Belluschi, a leader of the Modern Movement in architecture. Groundbreaking on the site began in 1973 and construction finished in 1975.

Against the backdrop of a nationwide economic downturn and the collapse of Baltimore's traditional harbor industries, the assessed values of downtown properties declined significantly by 1977, including 100 East Pratt, which was then leased by IBM. After further economic and political turbulence in the 1980s, construction on the building was renewed and completed in 1992 by Skidmore, Owings & Merrill. In 1997, the building's firm was bought by Boston Properties, and later bought by Wells Real Estate in 2005 for $205 million, and was added to the Wells REIT II portfolio. In 2013, the portfolio became its own company and the name was changed to Columbia Property Trust, after which, in 2016, Columbia Property Trust sold the Pratt building to New Jersey–based Vision Properties for $187 million.

== Architecture ==
Today, the building stands as a 418 ft. (128 m) tower made of aluminum, glass, and steel. The building contains more than 600,000 square feet (56,000 m^{2}) of office, retail, and conference space, as well as a fitness center on its twelfth floor. In addition to the main twenty-eight floor glass tower, are two smaller, adjoined structures: a ten-story south-facing concrete office building and an eight-level parking structure with nearly one thousand parking spaces. The trusswork on the roof of the building, while attractive and able to be illuminated decoratively, is not ornamental: it provides suspension for the southern façade.

== Tenants ==
Current office space tenants include financial services firms such as T. Rowe Price, Merrill Lynch, and PricewaterhouseCoopers. Tenants occupying street-level retail space include Starbucks, Brio Tuscan Grille, and JoS. A. Bank Clothiers.
