= One Charles Center =

Building by Ludwig Mies van der Rohe

- U.S. National Register of Historic Places
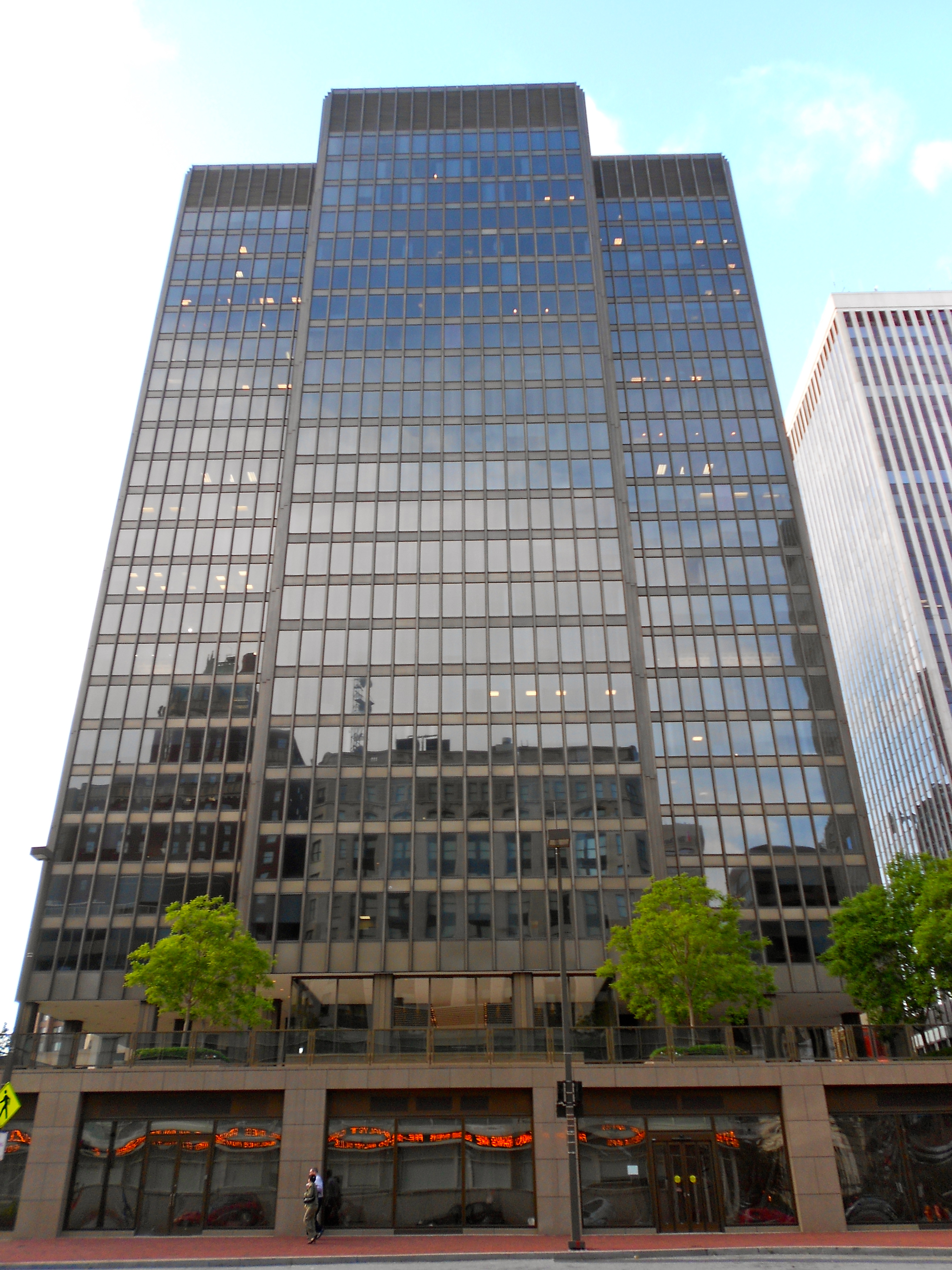

- Location within Baltimore Location within Maryland Location within the United States
- Location: 100 N. Charles St., Baltimore, Maryland
- Coordinates: 39°17′27″N 76°36′56″W
- Area: less than one acre
- Built: 1962
- Architect: Ludwig Mies van der Rohe
- Architectural style: International Style
- NRHP reference No.: 00000745
- Added to NRHP: July 13, 2000

One Charles Center is a historic office building located in Baltimore, Maryland, United States. It is a 23-story aluminium and glass International Style skyscraper designed by Ludwig Mies van der Rohe and constructed in 1962. It was the first modernistic office tower in Baltimore and part of the city's downtown urban renewal movement. The base consists of a concrete-faced podium topped by a paved plaza, with the T-shaped office tower atop. The tower includes metal trim and gray glass.

The tower was previously the subject of a design competition. It was completed in 13 months at a cost of $10,350,000. One Charles Center was listed on the National Register of Historic Places in 2000. It is located next to the Fidelity Building, which was completed in the 1890s.

In 1983, the Charles Center stop of the Baltimore Metro Subway opened one block south of the Charles Center complex at the intersection of Baltimore Street and Charles Street. This stop serves as a transportation hub that connects the Metro (extending west to the northwest suburbs of the city and east to Johns Hopkins Hospital) to local bus routes and the Charm City Circulator.

An anchor tenant, CSX Corporation, sold and vacated the property in the mid-1990s, leaving the tenancy rate low. This prompted an auction for new ownership in which Metropolitan Life Insurance Company, its mortgage holder, bought One Charles Center in 1993 for $11.5 million. Three years later in 1996, the building was purchased for $6 million by Peter Angelos, a lawyer native to Baltimore and the majority owner of the Baltimore Orioles major league baseball team. After renovations, new tenants moved into the building, including the law offices of Peter Angelos as well as the firm Wright Constable & Skeen.

Former tenants of One Charles Center include T. Rowe Price, an investment counsel firm and the Center Club of Baltimore.
