= Vivo Living Baltimore =

Building in Baltimore, Maryland

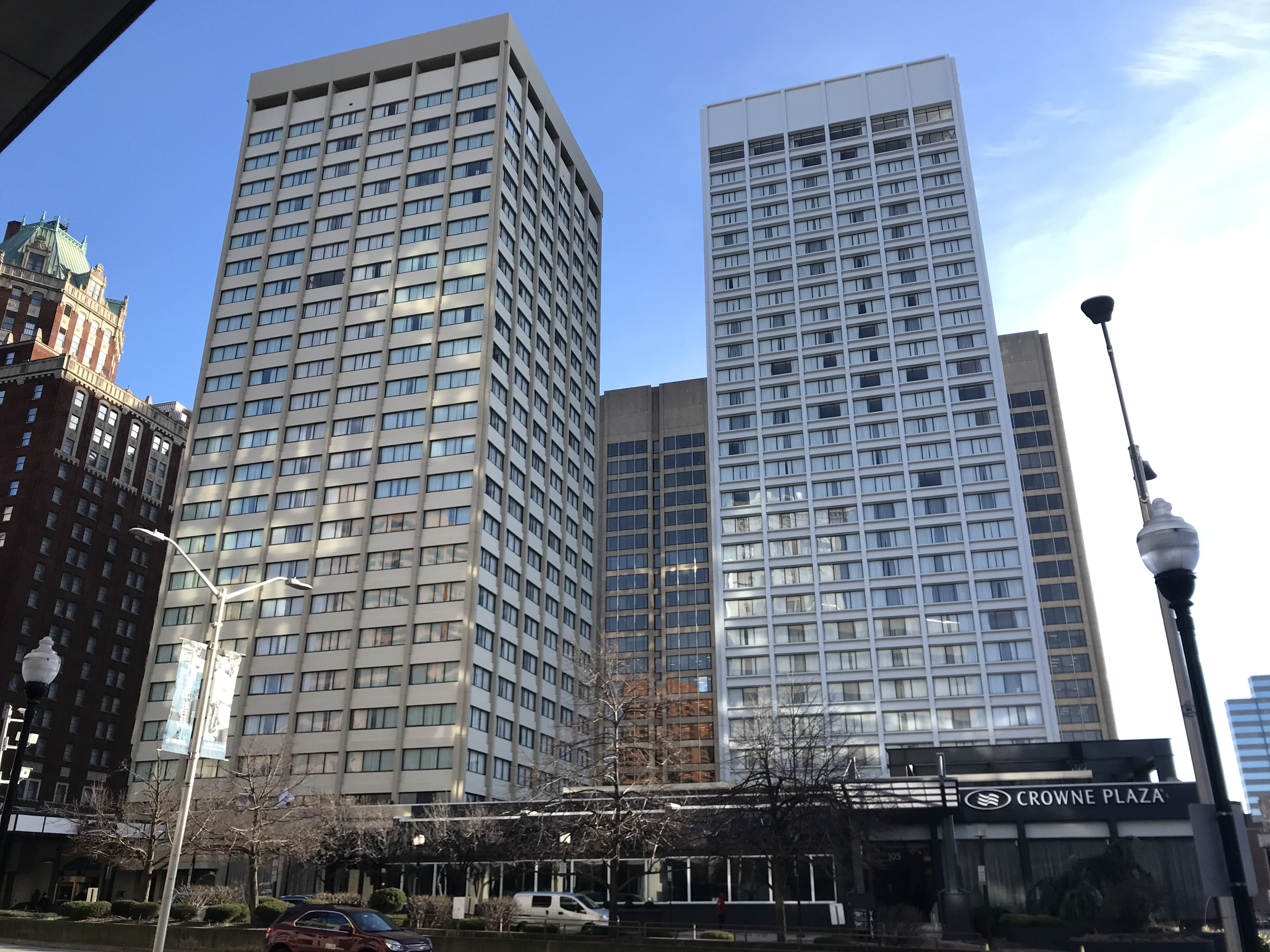
- 1967 tower on the left, 1974 tower on right
- Interactive map of the Vivo Living Baltimore area

General information
- Location: Baltimore, Maryland, 101 West Fayette Street
- Coordinates: 39°17′24″N 76°37′2″W
- Opening: July 15, 1967
- Operator: Vivo Living

Design and construction
- Architect: William B. Tabler

Website
- vivolivingbaltimore.com

Vivo Living Baltimore is an apartment complex located in a twin-tower former high-rise hotel in Baltimore, Maryland. It opened in 2023, while the hotel opened in 1967.

== History ==
The Statler Hilton Baltimore was conceived as part of the Charles Center urban renewal project in central Baltimore. The Hilton Hotels Corporation and Metropolitan Structures, Inc., signed a contract on July 25, 1964, to develop the property, with Hilton owning 18 percent. It was expected to cost $12 million and to eventually contain 500 to 800 rooms in two towers. The head architect was William B. Tabler, who had designed dozens of hotels for Hilton and other major chains around the world.

The Statler Hilton opened on July 15, 1967 with one 85-meter, 23-story tower, containing 352 rooms. The hotel was renamed The Baltimore Hilton in 1970. The 92-meter, 27-story south tower addition opened in 1974. In 1979, the hotel's original developer, William L. Siskind, sold the financially troubled property to Abruzzi N.V., a consortium of Middle Eastern investors, including the abu Ghazaleh family, who intended to renovate it. The hotel was the site of a 1980 Presidential debate between Ronald Reagan and John B. Anderson.

In 1984, Abruzzi N.V. sold The Baltimore Hilton to HMK Limited Partnership for $35.6 million and it was renamed the Omni International Hotel Baltimore, then later the Omni Inner Harbor Hotel. In September 1993, Westinghouse Electric Corporation liquidated the real estate portfolio of its troubled Westinghouse Financial Services investment arm, and sold the hotel to the Dallas-based Patriot American Acquisition Corp. for $18 million. On June 9, 1994, the hotel hosted the first WWF Hall of Fame induction ceremony. In December 1995, Patriot American sold the hotel to Houston-based Gencom Group Inc.. In December 1997, Patriot American reacquired the hotel for $57 million, four times what they had purchased it for four years before, as part of a package of 10 hotels they acquired when they bought Gencom for a total of $485 million.

Although Patriot American was the parent company of the Wyndham Hotels & Resorts chain, they chose to keep the property under the Omni banner to avoid brand confusion, because they were already developing a Wyndham property in the nearby Inner Harbor East neighborhood. When the deal for that property fell through, and it became a Marriott, Patriot American converted the Omni to a Wyndham on October 1, 2000, as the Wyndham Baltimore Inner Harbor. On January 16, 2006, Columbia Sussex bought the hotel from Wyndham International Inc., in a package of 14 Wyndham Hotels, for $1.4 billion. Soon after, on March 16, 2006, Columbia Sussex announced that the hotel would rebrand as a Sheraton, following renovations. The hotel was renamed Sheraton Baltimore City Center on January 18, 2007. In 2011, Columbia Sussex sold the hotel to The Blackstone Group.

On May 29, 2014, the property left Sheraton. The original 323-room north tower remained in operation as an independent hotel, renamed the Baltimore Harbor Hotel, while the south tower was closed and a separate operator was sought for it. On January 26, 2016, the entire property was sold to Long Island-based McSam Hotel Group for $14.4 million. The new owners announced that they were considering converting the vacant south tower to apartments. On May 18, 2016, the north tower became the Radisson Hotel Baltimore Downtown-Inner Harbor.

In March 2017, it was announced that the south tower would reopen as a Crowne Plaza hotel. The south tower reopened on June 19, 2018, as the 385-room Crowne Plaza Baltimore - Inner Harbor.

The two hotels had separate entrances on West Fayette Street, but shared all facilities, including a restaurant, 50,000 sq ft of convention space, service areas, and a parking garage.

The north tower Radisson hotel rooms closed temporarily at the start of the COVID-19 pandemic. The south tower rooms remained in operation, although the tower was downgraded from a Crowne Plaza to a Holiday Inn in Spring 2021, becoming the Holiday Inn Baltimore - Inner Harbor. Both hotels closed permanently on March 24, 2022, ahead of a planned sale and conversion to apartments. The hotels' 50 employees were let go.

El Segundo, California-based Vivo Living acquired the shuttered property in April 2022 and announced plans to convert the complex to apartments. The south tower began leasing units in summer 2023, with residents moving in as early as June 2023. The apartment complex's south tower features "efficiency" studio units between 250 and 525 sqft, 1 bedroom units at 535 sqft, and a single 1 bedroom 1 den unit at 900 sqft. The North Tower is under renovation, pending completion and attainment of use/occupancy permits- estimated early fall 2026.The complex opened in full in 2024, with 708 units, and 30,000 square feet of ground level retail.
