= 414 Light Street =

Building in Baltimore, Maryland, United States

Coordinates: 39°17′1.5″N 76°36′49.5″W

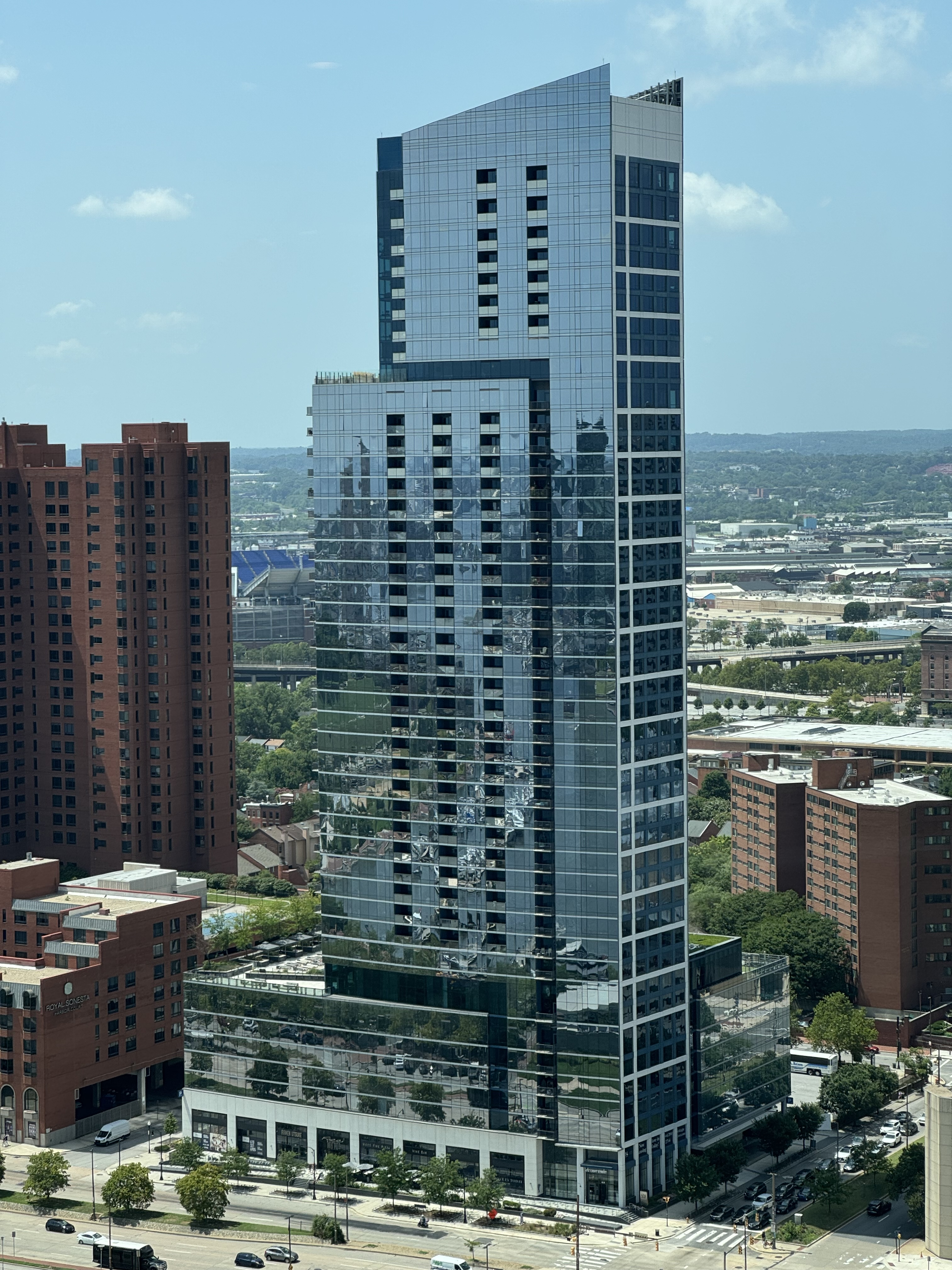
- Interactive map of the 414 Light Street area

General information
- Status: Completed
- Type: Mixed use (Business and residential)
- Location: Baltimore, Maryland, United States
- Opening: 2018

Height
- Antenna spire: 418 ft (127 m)
- Roof: 500 ft (150 m)

Technical details
- Floor count: 44
- Floor area: 635,297 sq ft (59,021.0 m^{2})

Design and construction
- Architect: Solomon Cordwell Buenz
- Structural engineer: VICTAULIC; Blum Consulting Engineers, Inc.
- Main contractor: Lendlease

Website
- 414lightstreet.com

414 Light Street is a building located on Light Street in the Inner Harbor district of Baltimore, Maryland. It consists of a 44-story glass and steel structure completed in 2018.

== History ==
=== Demolition of McCormick Factory ===
Located at the intersection of Light and Conway streets in Downtown Baltimore, 414 Light Street was built on the original site of the McCormick & Company. The 1921 industrial complex was a fond memory of many Baltimoreans for the spice aromas that wafted down to the streets below. The McCormick building was razed in 1988 after the company had left the city for Hunt Valley. The demolition of the original factory was heartily fought by preservationists, but The Rouse Company, developers of Columbia and Harborplace, won in the Maryland Court of Appeals. The Rouse Company's plans for a replacement structure never came to fruition, leaving the property as a vacant parking lot.

=== Construction of 414 Light ===
After 25 years as a parking lot, construction began on 414 Light Street in 2014. Designed by Chicago architecture firm Solomon Cordwell Buenz, the building has a contemporary style. The project is notable for being Baltimore's tallest apartment building, and third tallest skyscraper after the 1929 Bank of America Building. Construction finished at the end of 2018.

== Tenants ==
The building is home to 394 apartments as well as retail on the ground floor. The apartments are considered luxury-style from $1,800, and penthouse rentals at more than $8,000 a month per unit.
