= Mercantile Deposit and Trust (Baltimore, Maryland) =

- U.S. National Register of Historic Places
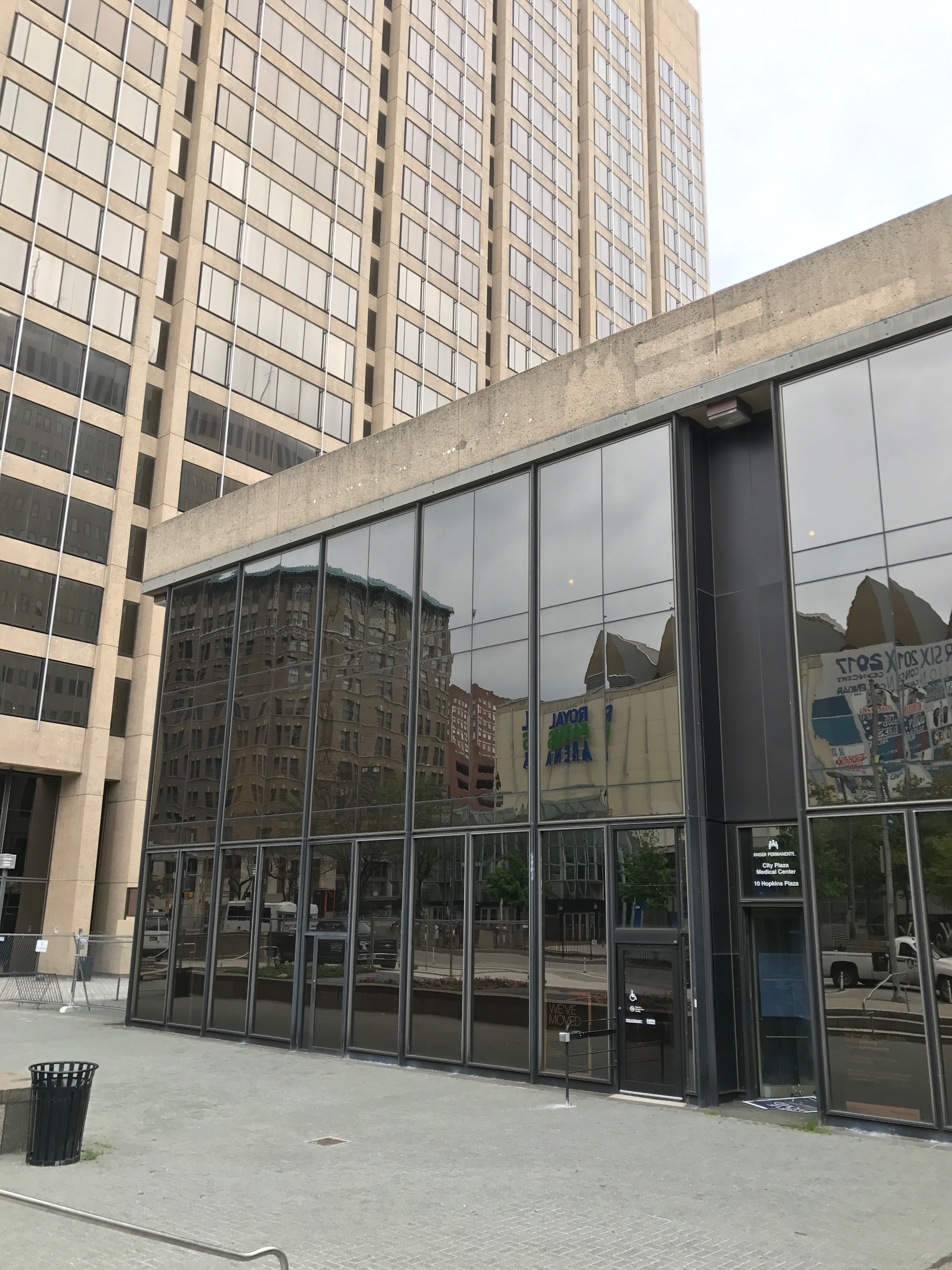

- Location within Baltimore Location within Maryland Location within the United States
- Location: 111 W Baltimore St. Baltimore, Maryland
- Coordinates: 39°17′20.8″N 76°37′02.3″W
- Area: less than one acre
- Built: 1969
- Built by: Emery Roth & Sons
- Architect: Peterson & Brickbauer
- Architectural style: Modern
- NRHP reference No.: 100003078
- Added to NRHP: November 5, 2018

Mercantile Deposit and Trust, also known as 2 Hopkins Plaza, 10 Hopkins Plaza, and 2Hopkins, are historic buildings located in Baltimore, Maryland, United States. They are significant as a competition-winning design that was part of an influential urban renewal plan known as the Charles Center Master Plan. This was Parcel 12 of that plan. The Modernist buildings were designed in 1965 by the local architectural firm of Peterson & Brickbauer and constructed by Emery Roth & Sons. The two separate structures are part of the same office complex. Built on a shared plaza, they are a 22-story office tower known as 2 Hopkins Plaza and a three-story pavilion known as 10 Hopkins Plaza. The office building rises to a height of 315 feet (96 m). It is one of the first reinforced concrete high-rise office buildings in Maryland.

The buildings were renovated in 2017 and have been converted into apartments known as 2Hopkins. They were listed on the National Register of Historic Places in 2018.
