= Munsey Trust Building =

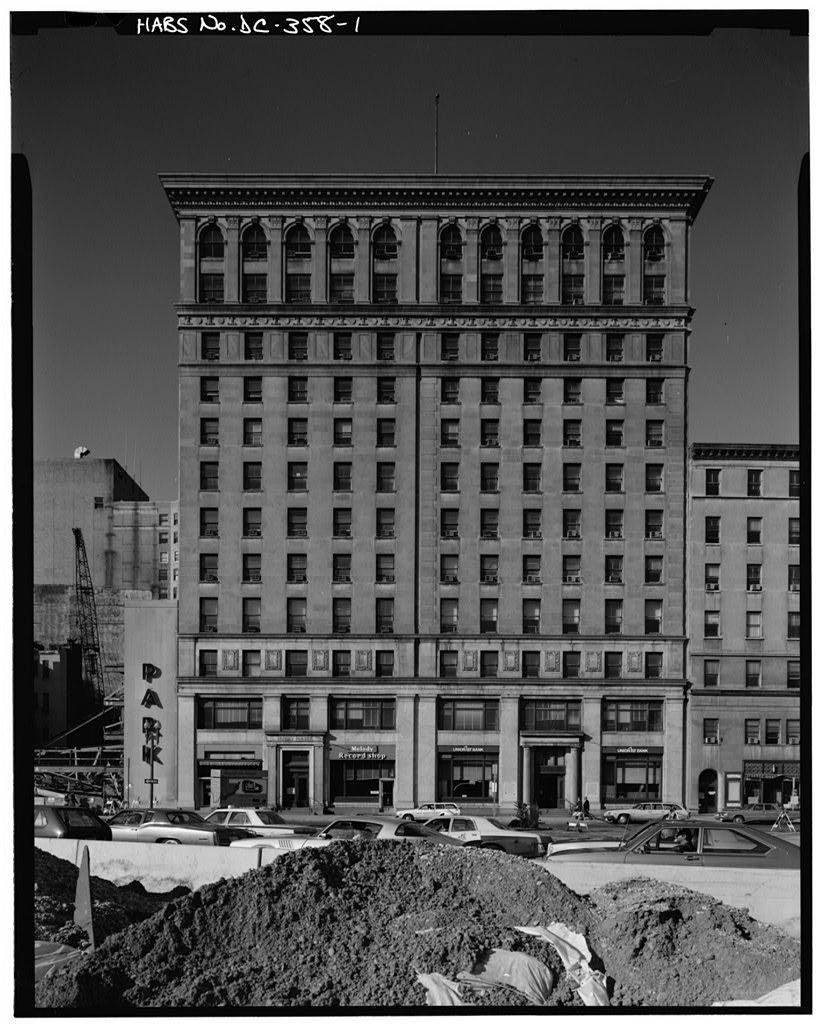

- Location within Central Washington, D.C.

General information
- Type: Office
- Location: Washington, D.C., United States
- Coordinates: 38.8972°N 77.0315°W
- Completed: 1905
- Demolished: 1980

Height
- Roof: 171 feet (52 m)

Design and construction
- Architect: McKim, Mead & White
- Main contractor: George Fuller Construction Company

The Munsey Trust Building was a historic high-rise office building located in Washington, D.C., United States, on E Street, N.W., between 13th and 14th Streets (adjacent to the National Theatre in the nation's capital city).

== History ==
The building's architect was McKim, Mead & White of New York City, and built for newspaper syndicate publisher, Frank A. Munsey (1854–1925). Known then as the "Dealer in Dailies" and the "Undertaker of Journalism", Munsey was extremely controversial and often feared and despised by both readers and reporters alike. But he anticipated many trends in modern journalism and his papers in the early 20th century were often very pictorial and graphic plus being widely distributed, influential and popular. A contemporary of the much more famous William Randolph Hearst (1863–1951), publisher of the San Francisco Examiner also a "newspaper tycoon", head of a powerful nationwide chain syndicate Hearst Corporation (and cultural predecessor of the current Rupert Murdoch (b. 1931), the Australian publisher who migrated to Great Britain picking up ownership of several papers there and later to the United States for more media/press publications and has a similar "robber baron" reputation).

Construction of the "Munsey Trust Building" was completed in 1905. The building rose to 171 feet (52 m) containing 13 floors, and was one of the highest structures in the city at the time, besides the Washington Monument, the Capitol dome, the tower of the old Post Office headquarters on Pennsylvania Avenue, and various church spires.

The first National Headquarters of the Girl Scouts of the USA was in Room 502 from 1913 until 1916.

After protests and court action to block demolition, the building was demolished in 1980, by contractor, for the Pennsylvania Avenue Development Corporation.

The site of the former building now contains the 16-story National Place Building.

== Baltimore building ==
There is also a similarly styled Munsey Building in Baltimore, Maryland by Baldwin & Pennington of Baltimore and also McKim, Mead and White of New York at the southeast corner of North Calvert and East Fayette Streets, across from the Battle Monument Square with the landmark and city symbol to the fallen from the British attack in the Battle of Baltimore in the War of 1812. Constructed in 1911 to replace, after just only five years, the previously just-constructed headquarters offices and printing plant in a moderately high skyscraper (with visible exhibited rolling presses behind huge glass department store style of first floor windows at ground level facing sidewalks) of The News (formerly the Baltimore Evening News - founded 1871) which he had just purchased in 1908 from long time local tycoon, Gen. Felix Agnus along with the ancient elder publication of The Baltimore American, one of the oldest papers in the country, published since 1773. These papers were later purchased from a declining Munsey in 1923 by Hearst and merged as the daily evening Baltimore News-Post and Sunday's publication of the Baltimore American. Three decades later, these were combined in 1964 as The News American published daily in the afternoon and Sunday morning with the biggest circulation in town, followed by competitors since 1837 from the A.S. Abell & Company of The Sun in the mornings and its later sister The Evening Sun added in 1910 under famed reporter, editor and columnist H. L. Mencken (1883–1956).

After a few years, Munsey converted this building to serve as the headquarters to his newly chartered Munsey Trust Company, founded in 1913, which was reorganized two years later as The Equitable Trust Company with Munsey as chairman of the board. By the late 1990s, Equitable Trust had become one of the largest banks in Maryland (and second largest to the restructured post-Great Depression era Maryland National Bank) in the Baltimore metropolitan area. By the 2000s it had been subsumed in a series of mergers and out-of-town take-overs by regional banks. Its name still remains on the East Fayette Street side cornice of the Baltimore "Munsey Building", which was converted in 2010's to luxury apartments and condos, and after a series of fast-food shops or cafes on the ground floor replaced the ornate marble and bronze banking customer service lobby, finally an M & T Bank branch opened in the historic banking and newspaper headquarters building in 2013.

== See also ==
- List of tallest buildings in Washington, D.C.
