= Vlastimil Koubek =

American architect (1927–2003)

- Born: March 17, 1927; Brno, Czechoslovakia
- Died: February 15, 2003 (aged 75); Arlington County, Virginia, U.S.
- Citizenship: United States
- Occupation: Architect
- Awards: Tucker Award of Excellence (1988); Award of Excellence, Washington Chapter, AIA (1988)
- Practice: Koubek Architects
- Buildings: Willard InterContinental Washington Annex and Office Building, L'Enfant Plaza Hotel, Franklin Tower
- Projects: Rosslyn, Virginia; Washington Harbor; Camden Yards Sports Complex

Vlastimil Koubek (March 17, 1927 – February 15, 2003) was an American architect who designed more than 100 buildings, most of them in the Washington metropolitan area, and whose total value topped $2 billion. Most of his work is Modernist in style, although he developed a few structures in other vernaculars. He created the site plan for the redevelopment of Rosslyn, Virginia, and his Ames Center anchored the area's economic recovery. He designed the World Building in Silver Spring, Maryland, which sparked redevelopment of that town's downtown; and the L'Enfant Plaza Hotel in Washington, D.C. In 1985, Washingtonian magazine called him one of 20 people "who in the past 20 years had the greatest impact on the way we live and who forever altered the look of Washington." In 1988, The Washington Post newspaper said his Willard Hotel renovation was one of 28 projects in the area that made a signal contribution to the "feel" and look of Washington, D.C.

== Early life and education ==
Koubek was born in Brno, Czechoslovakia, and received his degree in architecture from the Faculty of Architecture at Czech Technical University. After graduation, he worked for several Czech architecture firms, designing office buildings.

Because he and his father held strong anti-communist beliefs, Koubek decided to flee Czechoslovakia after the Communist coup d'état of February 1948. He tried but failed to cross the border into the American Zone of Occupation of Allied-occupied Germany. A second attempt in July succeeded. In October 1948, Koubek emigrated to the United Kingdom, where he worked in a brickyard, as a draftsman for the city of Gloucester and county of Gloucestershire, a draftsman for the Ministry of Works, and announcer for the Czech-language news service of the BBC. He met his future wife, Eva, in a bookstore in London. Eva was born in Prague, the daughter of a Czech Army officer. Her brother, whom she later rescued, was imprisoned in a concentration camp in Nazi Germany during World War II.

The couple emigrated to the United States via Ellis Island on February 8, 1952, and initially lived in New York City. When they arrived they had $6 in their pockets. They married in New York City on August 9, 1952, with Eva (the only one with any funds) paying the $2 marriage license fee. He worked as a draftsman for the architectural firm of Emery Roth and Sons, the city's largest architectural firm and a noted designer of office buildings, for a year. In 1953, Koubek entered the United States Army, where he worked for the Army Exhibit Unit, which creates displays and presentations about Army history, organization, and culture for the public. Koubek and his wife became naturalized United States citizens, moved to Washington, D.C, and raised a daughter, Jana. He briefly worked for the D.C.-based Edward Weihe architectural firm.

== Career ==
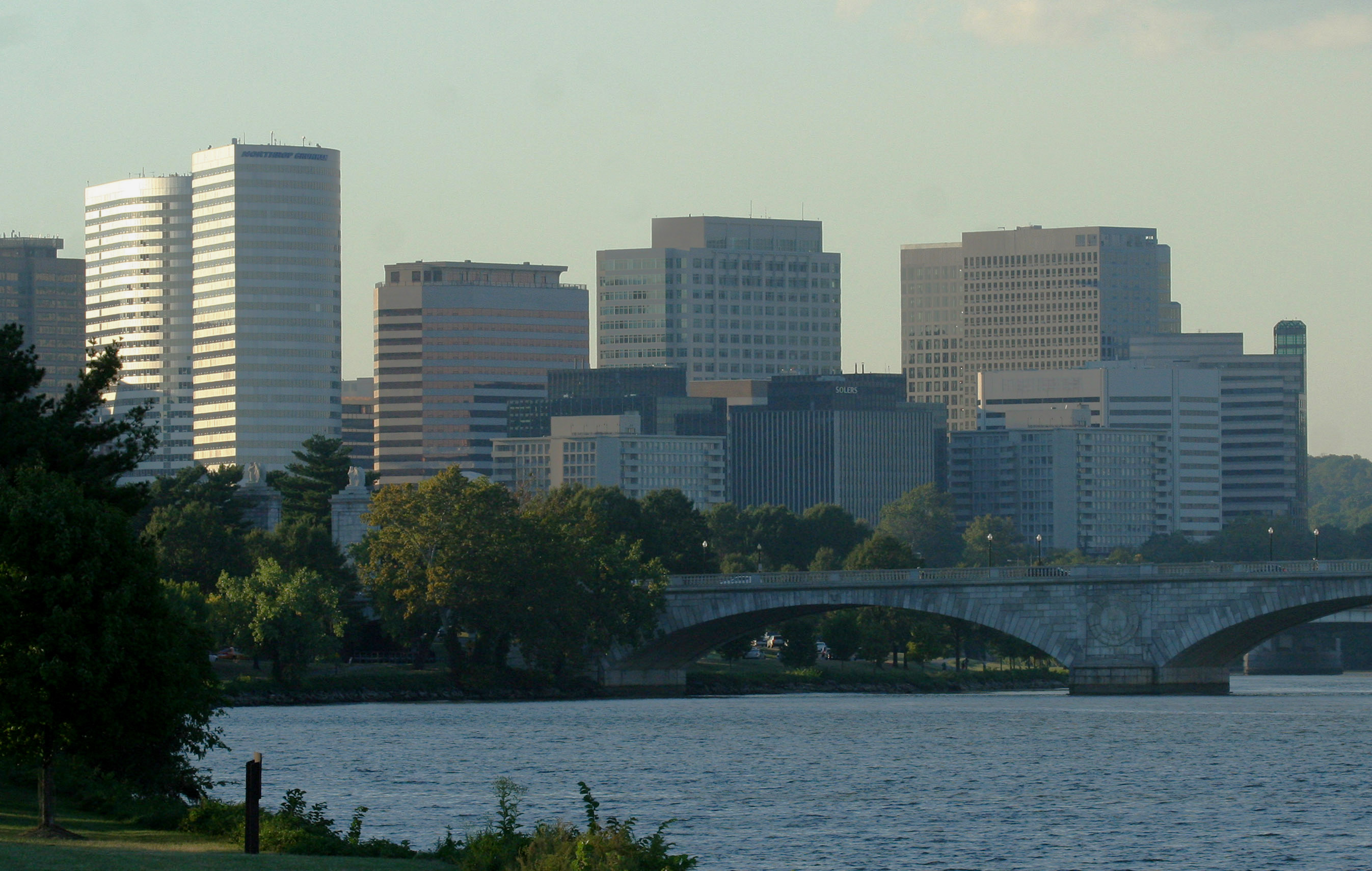
Rosslyn, Virginia, in 2007. Koubek was responsible for the master site plan which led to its high-rise developments.

Koubek passed his architectural exam and established Koubek Architects in 1957. One of his first commissions to be built was Southern Maryland Medical Center (now Southern Maryland Hospital Center) in Clinton, Maryland. His first major commission in the area was for 1701 Pennsylvania Avenue NW, a 13-story building with a facade of gold-anodized aluminum and white marble. But the United States Commission of Fine Arts, which had design approval authority over private buildings next to federal buildings in the city, objected to this facade. Koubek submitted a revised design that used larger, octagonal window designs of marble with recessed ribs of bronze aluminum; this was accepted and highly praised by influential architect Frederick Gutheim as pushing District architectural design "forward 10 years." A similar design was created for the facade of One Farragut Square South, which began construction in November 1960. A more Modernist glass-wall building was planned in October 1961 for 1666 Connecticut Avenue NW (the southwest corner of Connecticut Avenue NW and R Street NW).

=== Rosslyn ===
Koubek was instrumental in helping to redevelop Rosslyn, Virginia, an unincorporated area of Arlington County directly across the Potomac River from the Georgetown neighborhood of Washington, D.C. In 1960, Rosslyn was a seedy area of bars, pawnshops, small industry, and used car lots. But land values in Rosslyn had risen, and to take advantage of the building boom they believed was coming, Arlington County county planners required site plans that emphasized tall, free-standing buildings. In 1961, Koubek drafted a site plan for the 80-acre (32 ha) site around the proposed Ames Center (an area that represented about half the total acreage in the Rosslyn area). Koubek also was the architect for the Ames Center itself, a complex which included a 13-story office building, bank, church, and civic auditorium located at 1820 N. Fort Myer Drive.

The construction of the Ames Center and approval of a site plan for the area around it led to the wholesale economic and architectural redevelopment of Rosslyn, Koubek also developed the site plan for the area bounded by Wilson Boulevard, North Arlington Ridge Road, 19th Street North, and North Kent Street. This included the London House and Normandy House apartment complexes. Although it also proposed constructing two apartment complexes in the center of the area, three office buildings were built. London House opened in January 1965.

=== Other works in the 1960s ===
Numerous commissions came his way throughout the 1960s. His Jefferson Building (1225 19th Street NW), built in 1963, was an eight-story glass-and-marble clad structure that was the first skyscraper in the city to feature a columnless interior. It became home to the upscale The Palm steak restaurant in December 1972, although building's exterior reflecting pool and numerous fountains were replaced by a mundane garden and short trees. Later that year, he designed a sister building across the street (1234 19th Street NW) which incorporated solarized glass windows, dark bronze panels, and dark brown aluminum ribbing. He was the chief architect of the World Building (8121 Georgia Avenue) in Silver Spring, Maryland, The World Building helped revitalize the long-blighted Silver Spring downtown business district, and became home to long-time home of top-rated radio stations WWRC and WGAY. One of Koubek's less notable efforts, however, was the 1963 five-story Del Ray Building (4905 Del Ray Avenue) in Bethesda, Maryland, a nondescript office building with a penthouse clad in grey brick. In 1964, Koubek received his first commission from outside the District of Columbia and its immediate suburbs. This was Horizon House (1101 N. Calvert Street) in Baltimore, Maryland, an 18-story apartment building with a rooftop pool and ground-floor retail area in the historic Mount Vernon neighborhood.

In March 1963, he created a design for 1050 31st Street NW, a spare, Federalist-style red brick building—the first such non-Modernist structure he designed. He had initially proposed in 1961 a building with an all-glass first floor and exposed stone upper floors, but the Commission of Fine Arts rejected his design as too modern. After redesigning his building along Federalist lines, the Commission approved the design. However, the D.C. zoning board refused to approve it because of the changes. The zoning board also was unhappy with the way Koubek intended to conceal the elevator and air conditioning equipment on the roof. After redesigning the rooftop, the building began construction in March 1963. The first major office building to be constructed on the Georgetown waterfront in 50 years,

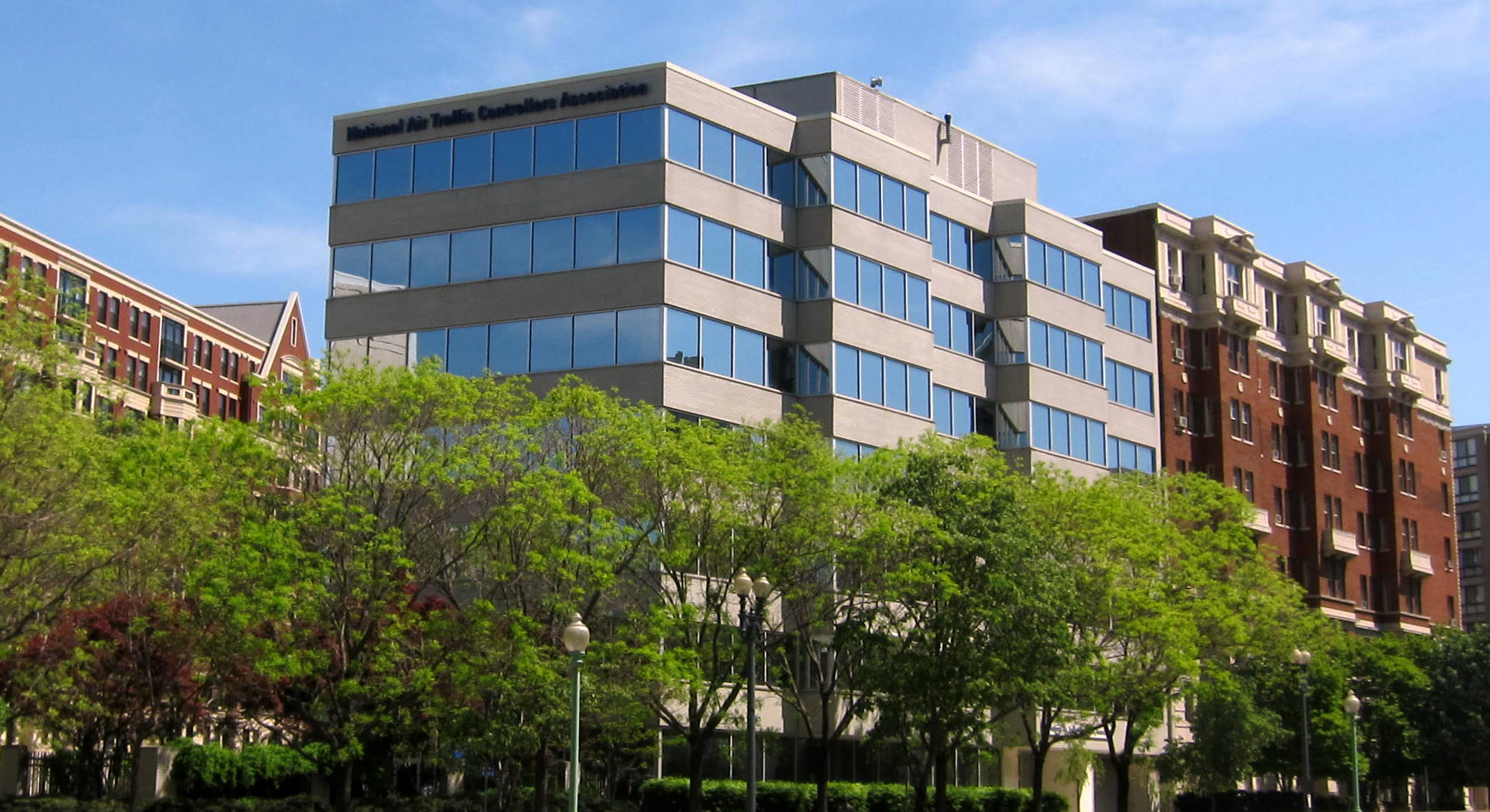
Koubek's 1325 Massachusetts Avenue NW

Construction began in April 1963 on his Brawner Building (888 17th Street NW), a 12-story office building on Farragut Square that incorporated dark bronze panels and solarized windows much as his 1234 19th Street building had. By the late 1960s, it was one of his best-known designs. In January 1964, Koubek designed what was then the D.C. metropolitan region's tallest office building, the 19-story steel-and-black glass-clad Barlow Building (5454 Wisconsin Avenue). In August, the Freed family commissioned him to build the eight-story Chatham Apartments, the first high-rise, medium-income apartment building to be constructed among the two-story Georgian-style townhouses that comprised the 125 acres (51 ha) Buckingham Historic District. His first major D.C. residential structure was a nine-story apartment building (now turned to condominiums) at 1800 R Street NW, which opened in October 1964. In April 1965, construction began on the seven-story 1325 Massachusetts Avenue NW, a Modernist building with broad horizontal swaths of grey brick and glass. (The structure was home to the National Air Traffic Controllers Association and National Gay and Lesbian Task Force in 2011.) Another major office building, 1200 17th Street, NW (at the time, the headquarters of the American Psychological Association), opened in October 1965. It was a neo-Brutalist structure featuring repetitive polished concrete panels and deeply recessed rectangular windows and one of the first high-rise office buildings on the downtown business district portion of Connecticut Avenue. That same year his 18-story Ross Building (now known as Wytestone Plaza) in Richmond, Virginia opened—the first high-rise built in the city since 1928, and the first glass-curtain wall building constructed in the city. Koubek was also lead architect for and an investor in a syndicate ("Reservation Eleven Associates") which designed a new United States Department of Labor (DOL) building at 2nd Street NW and Constitution Avenue NW in 1966. The group proposed an arrangement in which it would construct the building, lease it to the federal government for 30 years, and then donate it to the government. Congress, cutting back on construction funds and interested in the build/lease/donate proposal, refused to appropriate funds for the DOL structure. Eventually, however, Koubek's syndicate lost the commission. A new DOL building (jointly designed by the firms of Brooks, Barr, Graeber & White and Pitts, Mebane, Phelps & White) was completed in 1974.

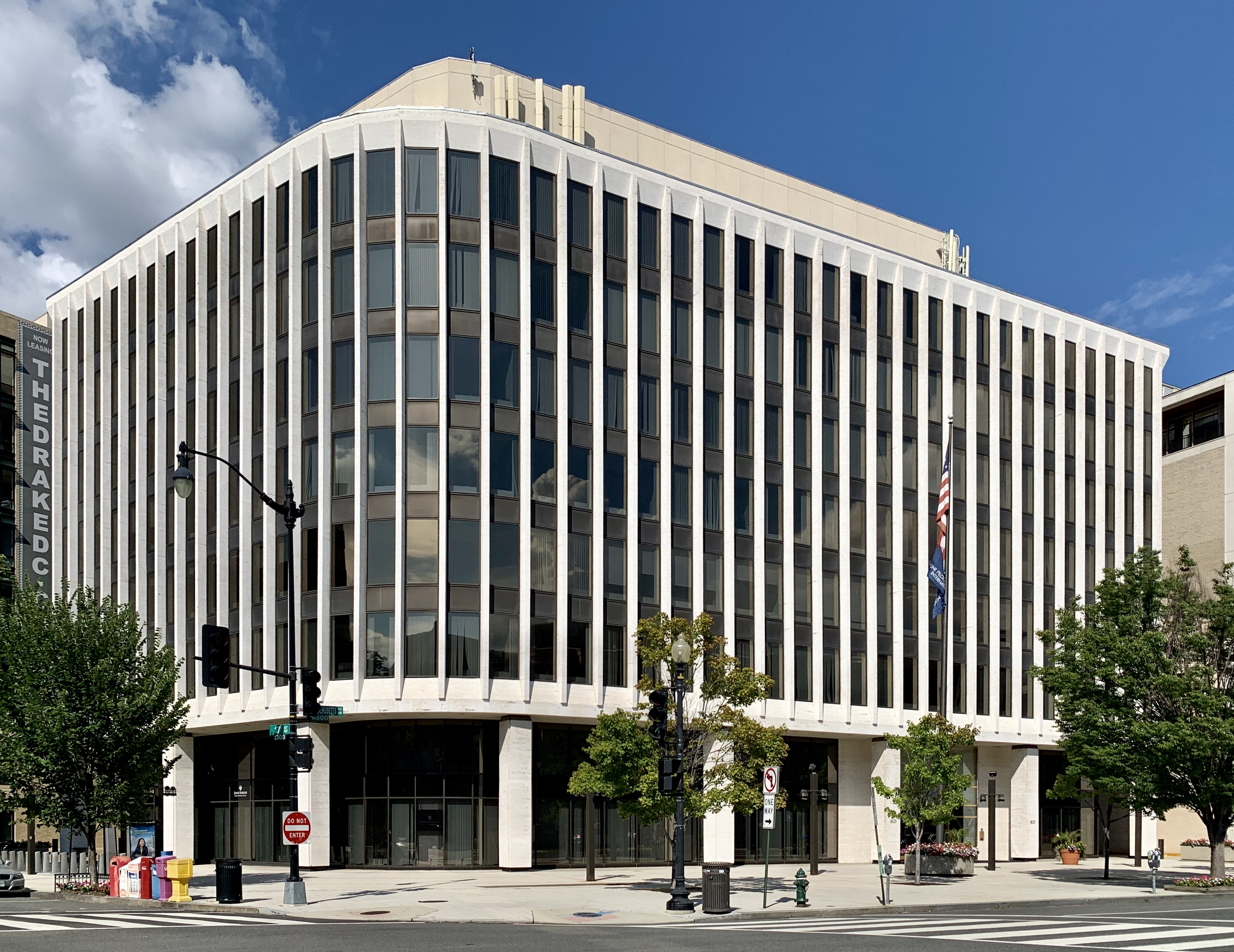
The Air Line Pilots Association Building, 1625 Massachusetts Avenue NW.

Koubek's D.C. area output slowed in the late 1960s. In February 1967, the Bureau of National Affairs (a privately held publisher of government news) commissioned him to design a six-story Modernist building at 1231 25th Street NW. (This glass-and-white concrete neo-Brutalist building was stripped to its frame in 2007, four floors added, and joined to both an existing and a new structure to create luxury apartments.) In October 1967, construction began on his design for 1401 I Street NW, west of Franklin Square. (The bland glass-and-steel box underwent a multimillion-dollar renovation in 1991. It was given a postmodern facade of finished grey concrete panels and brown granite, the center portion of the building on the south and east sides extended slightly outward to break up the flatness of the building, and twin giant six-story-high non-structural Doric columns topped by a non-structural colonnade and entablature. The building is now called Franklin Tower.) In December 1967, Koubek designed a new home for the Motion Picture Association of America at 1601 I Street NW, described as a "bronze-tinted glass box on stilts enclosed by a bold screen of tan concrete". Another critic later called it "elegant" and as good as the work of I. M. Pei. Construction began in February 1968 on his building for One Dupont Circle NW, an eight-story office building with vertical concrete ribs over glass walls.

Meanwhile, Koubek was at work designing Bayfront Plaza, a $50 million "scaled-down Rockefeller Center" complex of hotels, apartment buildings, retail shops, and piers on the waterfront of St. Petersburg, Florida. Proposed in 1966, the project was significantly delayed by lawsuits from local citizens. Costs began to climb, interest rates on the proposed development loans soared, and the project was canceled in 1969. Koubek sued lawyer Hubert Caulfield and businessman Martin Roess, who led the legal challenges against Bayfront Plaza, for $7 million, claiming legal harassment and abuse of the judicial process. The Supreme Court of Florida eventually ruled in favor of the developers, but it was too late. The parties settled out of court in 1972 for an undisclosed sum, and Koubek said he was pleased with the settlement. A 23-story office building planned for downtown Roanoke, Virginia, in 1969 was never built.

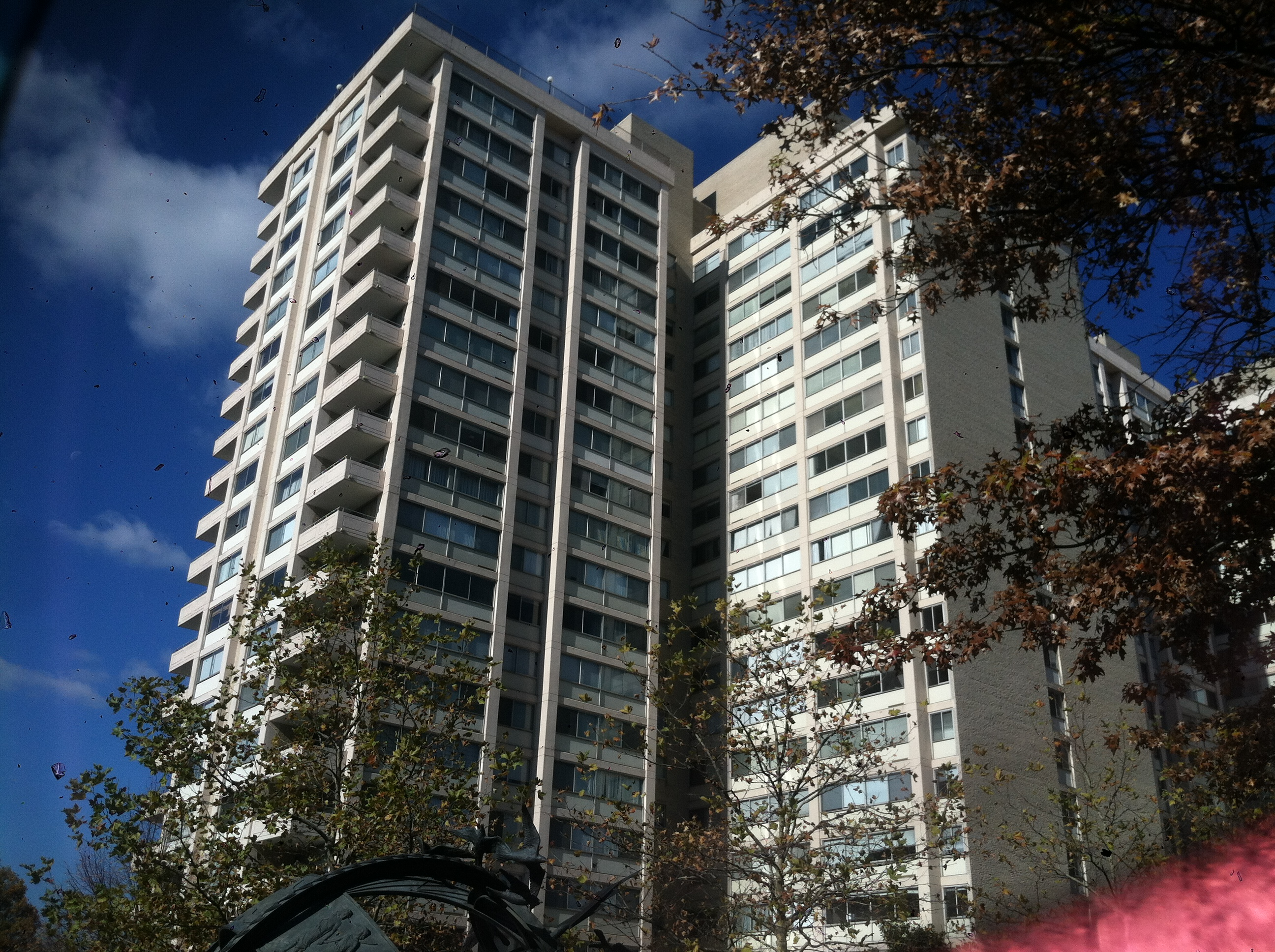
The Willoughby of Chevy Chase Condominium

Several of Koubek's buildings for important clients began or completed construction in 1969. The Willoughby, at the time the largest apartment building in the D.C. metropolitan area, opened at 4515 Willard Avenue in Friendship Village, Maryland, in January. Koubek assisted former First Lady Mamie Eisenhower and developer William Zeckendorf in breaking ground in February for the West Building (475 L'Enfant Plaza SW; now United States Postal Service headquarters), at 640,000 square feet (59,000 m^{2}) the largest private office building at the time in Washington. Eight months later, his headquarters at 1133 15th Street NW for Fannie Mae (the secondary mortgage market packaging corporation) opened.

=== Works from the 1970s ===
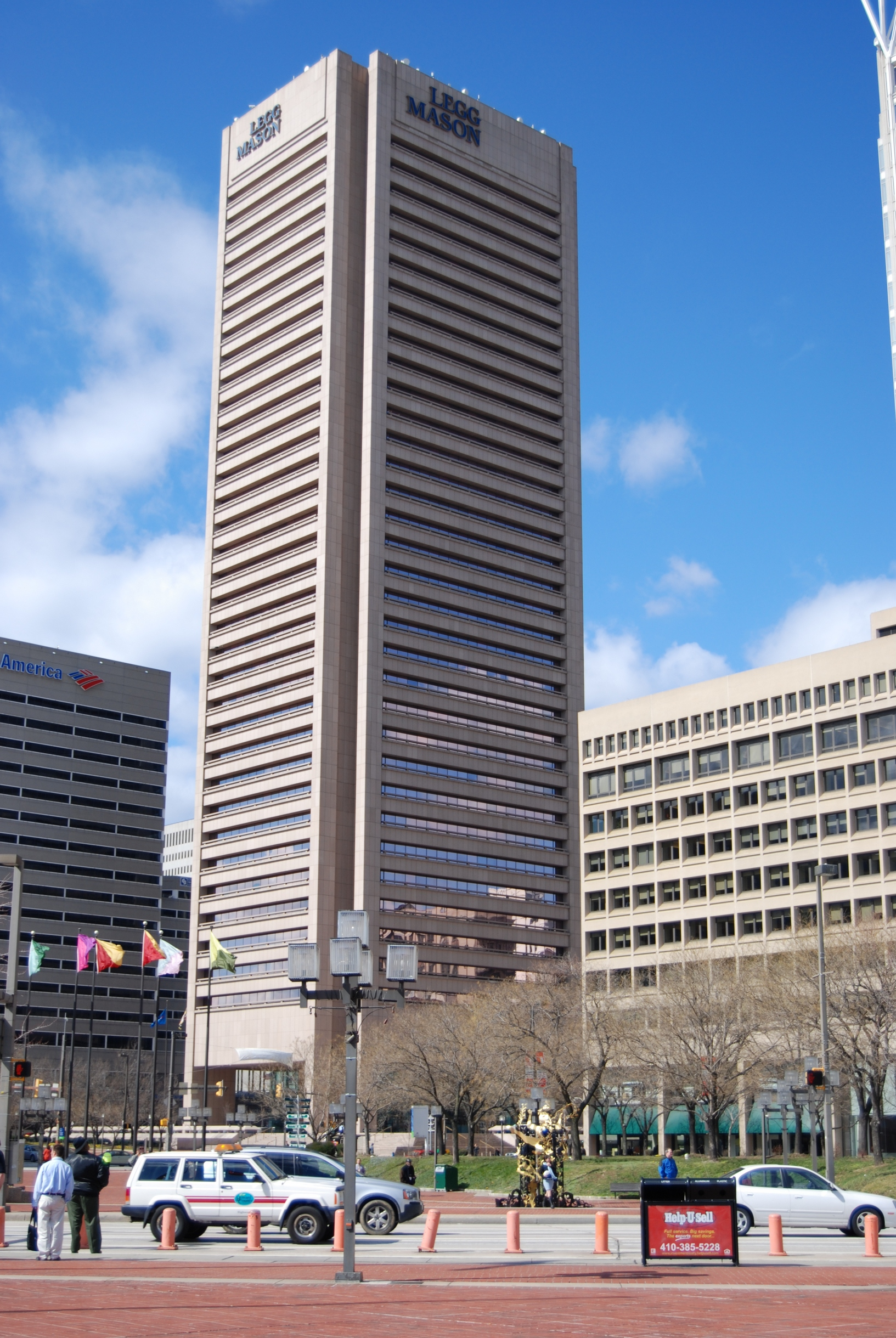
Vlastimil Koubek's USF&G Building (now the Transamerica Tower), as of 2012 still the tallest building in Baltimore and its most prominent landmark.

Additional commissions from important clients as well as notable buildings continued in the 1970s. Construction on the Koubek-designed 1,000,000 square feet (93,000 m^{2}), $23 million L'Enfant Plaza Hotel and office building began until June 1971. In July 1970, construction began on his 37-story, pink granite United States Fidelity and Guaranty Company Building in Baltimore. It was the largest building yet constructed in the United States to employ the slipform method of continuously poured concrete. The USF&G Building successfully sparked the economic revival of the Inner Harbor. Opened in 1974, as of 2010 it remained the tallest building in Baltimore. Forty years later, it is considered a Baltimore landmark. Richard Burns of Design Collective Inc. has said, "In my opinion, his USF&G tower, now Legg Mason, is one of the best if not the best office buildings in downtown Baltimore. It is simple, direct, and honest..." David Wallace, whose Wallace Roberts and Todd designed the master site plan for the Inner Harbor, declared it the "linchpin for the Inner Harbor. If you look at it from a boat, it's a punctuation point at one corner of the Inner Harbor, signifying where the central business district meets the waterfront." Construction started on his eight-story 2021 K Street NW office building in November 1970. In the summer of 1971, he completed his site plan for Friendship Heights, a 150 acres (61 ha) site straddling the boundary between the District of Columbia and Maryland border at Friendship Heights/Friendship Village. The plan contemplated several high-rise office buildings, a loop roadway around the site, pedestrian concourses, and several multi-story shopping malls clustered around the intersection of Wisconsin Avenue and Western Avenue. His plan was never executed. In March 1971, the American Automobile Association commissioned him to design a six-story, $10-million headquarters for the group at 8111 Gatehouse Road in Fairfax, Virginia. Eight months later, the Air Line Pilots Association (ALPA) began construction on a Koubek-designed headquarters at 1625 Massachusetts Avenue NW, three blocks northwest from his 1965 office building and across the street from the Philippine Embassy. In March 1974, developer Melvin Lenkin commissioned Koubek to design an all-glass Modernist building for 1900 M Street NW. Koubek designed an eight-story cubist building with an all-glass facade; cutaway, cantilevered front corner; and ground floor arcade. In March 1975, the National Bank of Washington, one of the city's oldest and most storied banks, commissioned a new operations center (4340 Connecticut Avenue NW) from Koubek. In May 1975, Koubek joined a consortium of prominent local architects to design the Washington Harbor complex of buildings on the Georgetown waterfront. The three-block-long, eight-building complex, which contained luxury condominiums, office space, restaurants, luxury retail space, a boardwalk, and plaza, was the first large-scale redevelopment of Georgetown's waterfront in the city's history. By the end of 1975, The New York Times was reporting that Koubek's firm had designed roughly half the office buildings built in the District of Columbia since the 1950s.

=== The Willard renovation ===
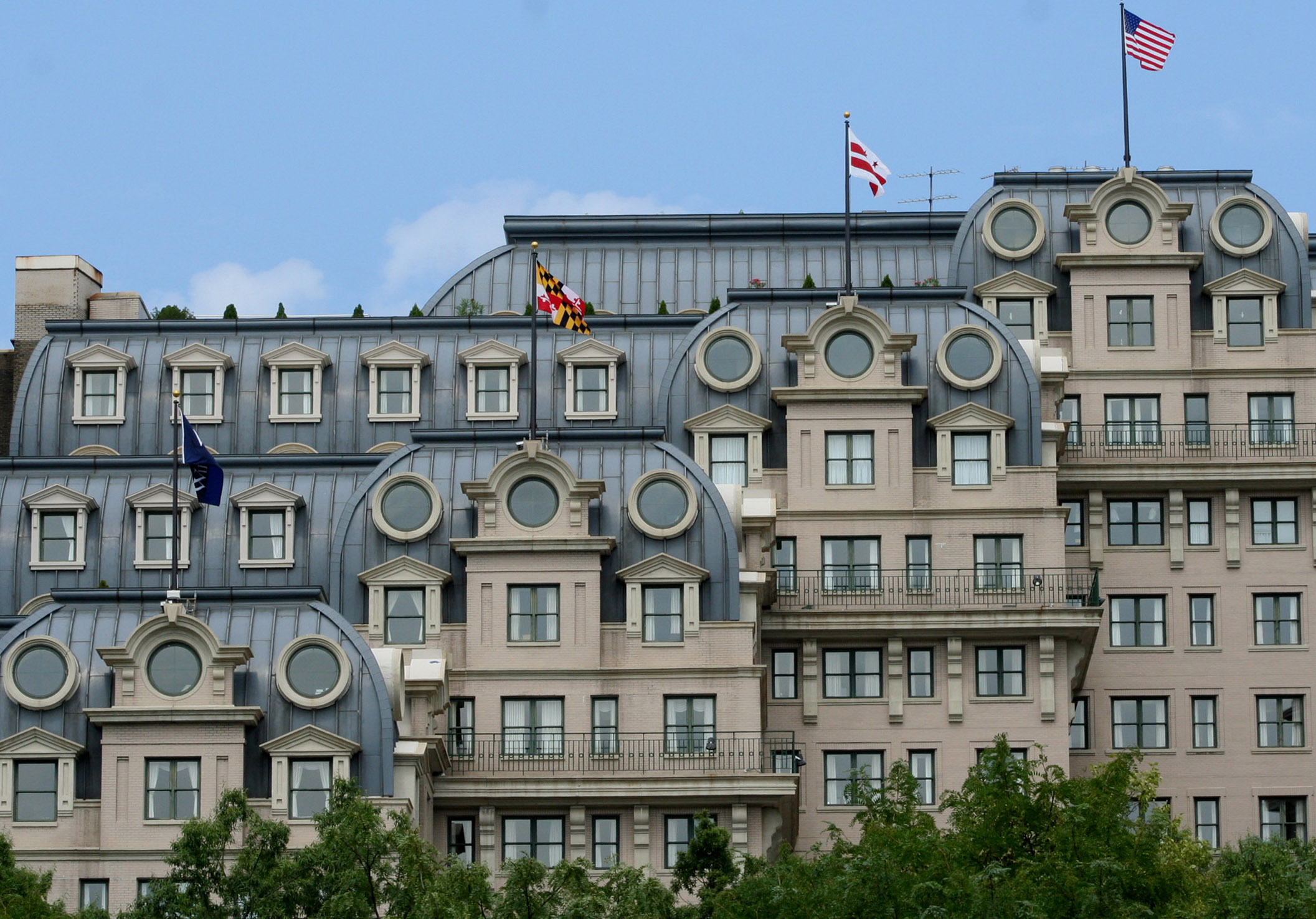
The Annex at the Willard Hotel, with concept by Hardy Holzman Pfeiffer Associates and implementation by Vlastimil Koubek.

In 1974, Koubek was hired to help renovate the long-shuttered, historic Willard Hotel. The original hotel (consisting of six townhouses joined together) was built in 1816, renovated, and enlarged by leaseholder Henry Willard in 1847. The current 12-story structure was erected in 1901. Due to mismanagement and competition from more modern hotels, the Willard closed in 1968. With the redevelopment of Pennsylvania Avenue in the 1960s and 1970s, the Willard was threatened repeatedly with demolition. In May 1974, the National Trust for Historic Preservation paid Koubek $25,000 to study saving the hotel, either as a hotel, as a mixed-use structure, or as an office building. The Willard's owners, Charles Benenson and Robert Arnow, had earlier commissioned Koubek to design a modern office building for the site, which would have required demolition of the structure.

Ultimately, the New York City architecture firm of Hardy Holzman Pfeiffer Associates was hired to lead the hotel's rehabilitation and expansion. After this firm pulled out of the project, Koubek executed their concept, overseeing work until the hotel's reopening in 1986. Declaring the design worthy of "genuine architectural distinction," The Washington Post architectural critic Benjamin Forgey noted that Koubek was responsible for adding the giant ocular windows in the office complex, the marble office entryway with its marble canopy and columns, and the restructuring of the diagonal courtyard between the original hotel and the office additions. Forgey concluded that "...a lot of the details, such as the exquisite storefronts or the sequence of pilasters, entablatures and cornices in the same elongated courtyard, are a treat to the eye." Critic Paul Goldberger, writing for The New York Times in 1986, declared the renovation ingenious. In 1988, the Washington Chapter of the American Institute of Architects gave its 1988 Award for Excellence to Koubek for the Willard Hotel design and renovation.

=== Other 1970s projects ===
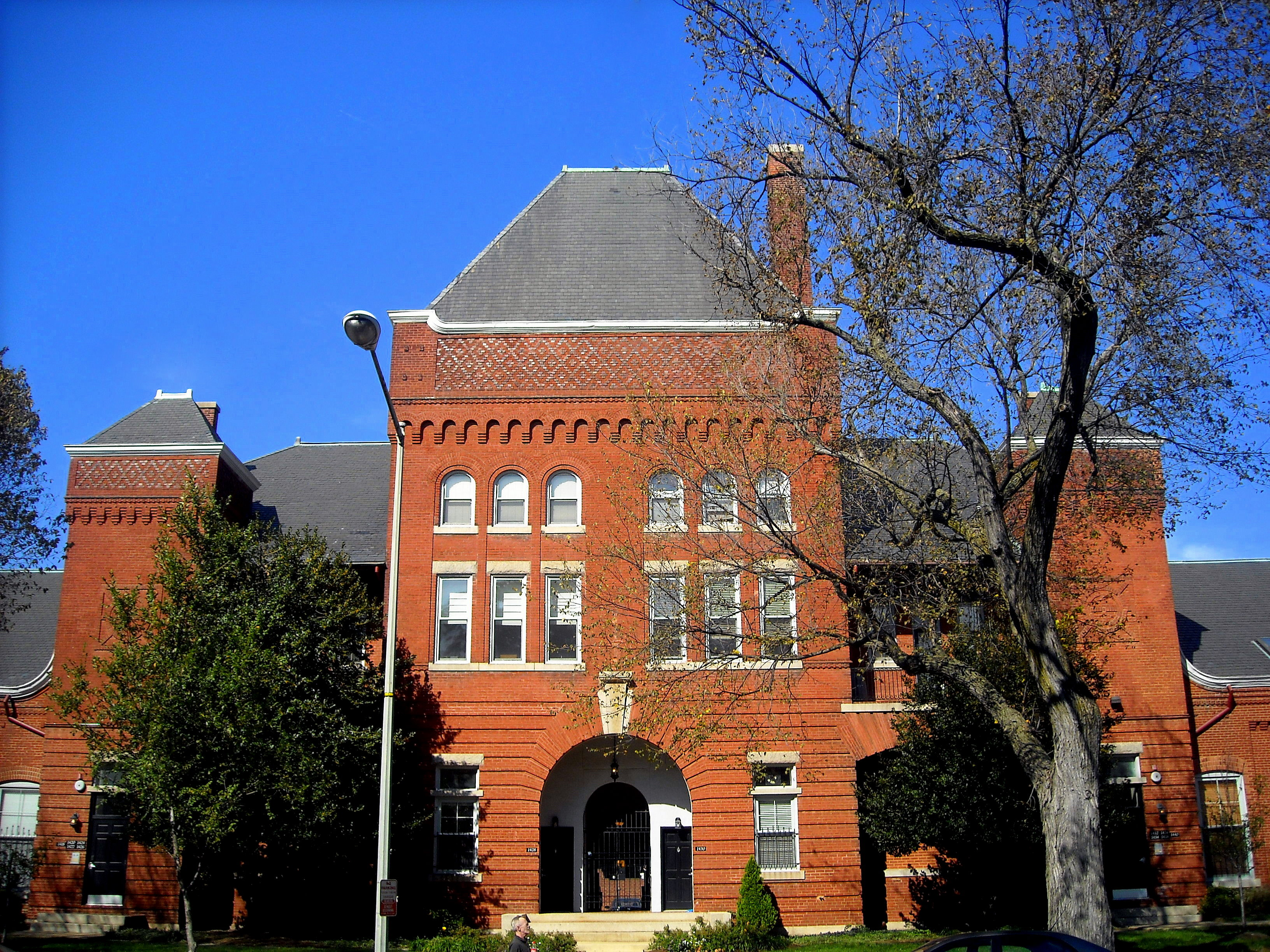
The historic Car Barn building, renovated by Koubek in 1979–1980

In February 1976, Koubek contributed a third high-rise office building to Farragut Square, this one a brick-and-solarized glass structure with a glass-and-aluminum penthouse at 818 Connecticut Avenue NW. His massive, grid-like 400 North Capitol Street, one of the few office buildings he designed with a plaza between two wings, opened in June. His 12-story International Square building—with its inverted setbacks above the Farragut West Washington Metro station, ninth-floor balcony with non-structural columns, interior atrium, and ground-level set-back retail concourse—opened in November. Originally just a single office building on a corner for a city block, it expanded to occupy nearly the entire block with the addition of two almost identical towers in 1979 and 1980. (The atrium was upgraded and a fountain added in 1992.) Two blocks to the west, in April 1977, Koubek also designed a fairly nondescript office building at 1990 K Street NW.

Koubek also helped co-design Metropolitan Square, a 12-story hotel and office building complex that occupies the entire block between F and G Streets NW and 14th and 15th Streets NW (due east across the street from the Treasury Building). In November 1977, developer Oliver T. Carr proposed tearing down the entire block occupied by the Beaux-Arts Keith-Albee Building and Metropolitan National Bank Building, and the 180-year-old Rhodes Tavern. A years-long legal and political battle ensued as historic preservationists fought to keep all three buildings. Carr eventually agreed to retain the facades of the two Beaux-Arts buildings facing G and 15th Streets. The battle to save the entire Rhodes' Tavern, however, lasted into 1983 and involved a citywide ballot initiative and an appeal to the Supreme Court of the United States. To preserve the facades, Carr hired Koubek and the New York City firm of Skidmore, Owings and Merrill and charged them with designing ground-floor retail entrances and two upper floors which would reflect but not mimic the Beaux-Arts style of the retained facades which building a more modern structure behind them. Construction on the new building began in 1980.

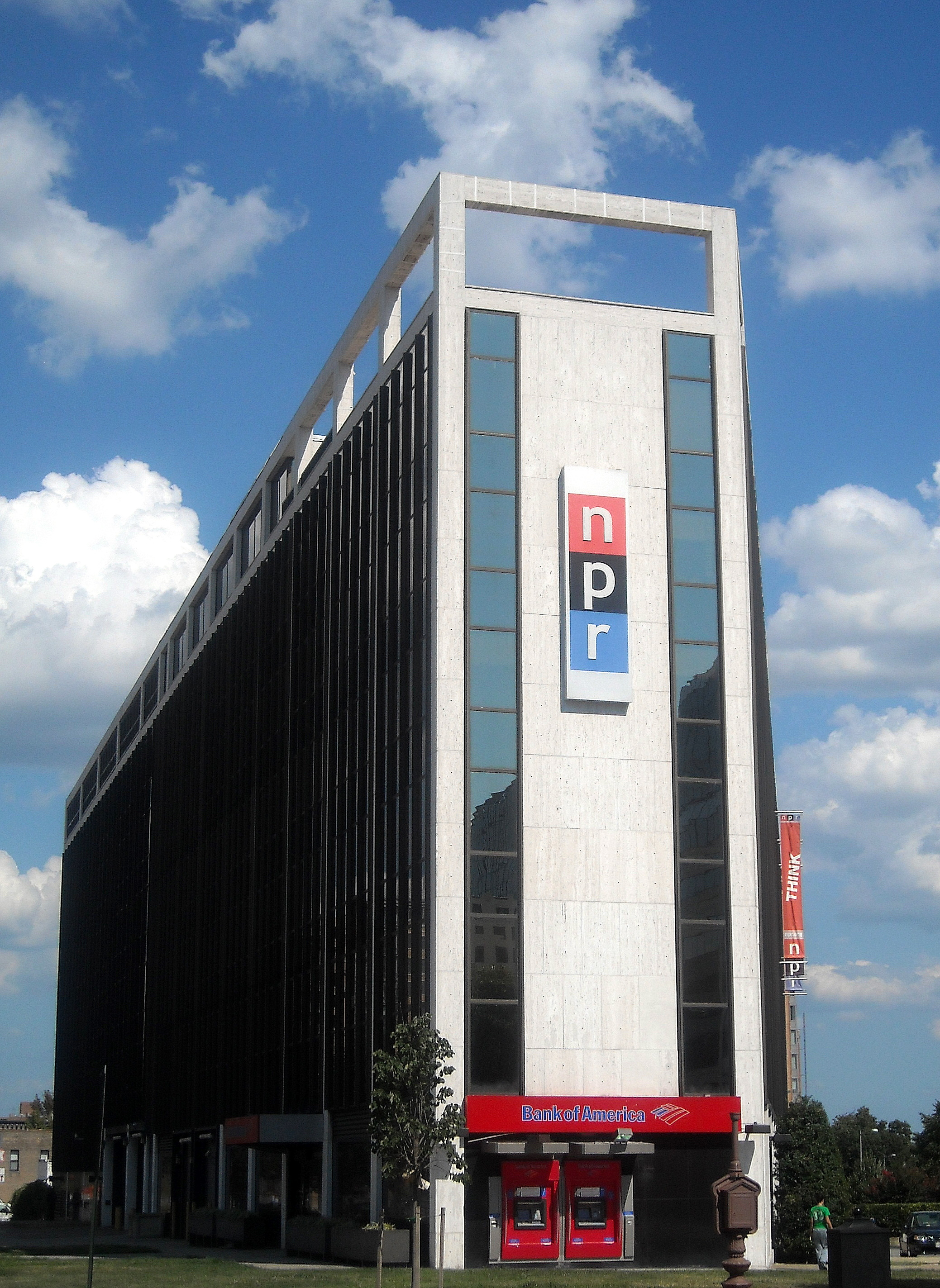
Koubek's 635 Massachusetts Avenue NW, formerly home to National Public Radio, was demolished in 2013.

In late 1977, Koubek also completed the Camden Yards Sports Complex master site plan, which laid out projected baseball and football stadiums, museums, restaurants, and retail shopping buildings to revitalize the economically depressed Camden Yards area of downtown Baltimore. In September 1978, Koubek was commissioned to design an addition to the American Security Bank operations center at 635 Massachusetts Avenue NW. (National Public Radio purchased the building in 1992 but sold the black-glass and travertine marble structure to Boston Properties in 2008. After the broadcaster's new building at 1111 North Capitol Street was completed in 2013, Boston Properties tore down 635 Massachusetts Avenue. A Class A office building will be erected in its place by 2015.) Also, in 1978, Koubek's 22-story Virginia Electric and Power Company headquarters in Richmond also opened. (It is now known as One James River Plaza.) In March 1979, Koubek agreed to design the interior renovations to the East Capitol Street Car Barn, an 83-year-old trolley barn at 14th and East Capitol Streets NE listed on the National Register of Historic Places, turning the old industrial site into a $10 million apartment and condominium complex. The renovation was called "striking". Koubek also participated in the redevelopment of Vermont Avenue NW. In June 1979, as buildings were razed across the street for the construction of 1090 Vermont Avenue, he was commissioned by the D.C. chapter of the American Medical Association to build a Modernist 12-story office building at 1100 Vermont Avenue NW. A month later, construction began on Koubek's Spring Valley Center, a luxury shopping, restaurant, and office building located at 4801 Massachusetts Avenue NW (on the site of the old Apex Theater). The six-story post-Modernist brick structure was not well received. In 1998, one critic noted that it is "a structure easy to dislike. Clad in brick and encircled by horizontal window bands, it [is] volumetrically and dimensionally out of scale with its more domestically scaled neighbors. Unrelieved planar walls and minimalist detailing made it even less charming." (The structure was sold to American University's Washington College of Law in 1994 after a lengthy legal battle and turned into classrooms and professors' offices.)

=== Works of the 1980s ===
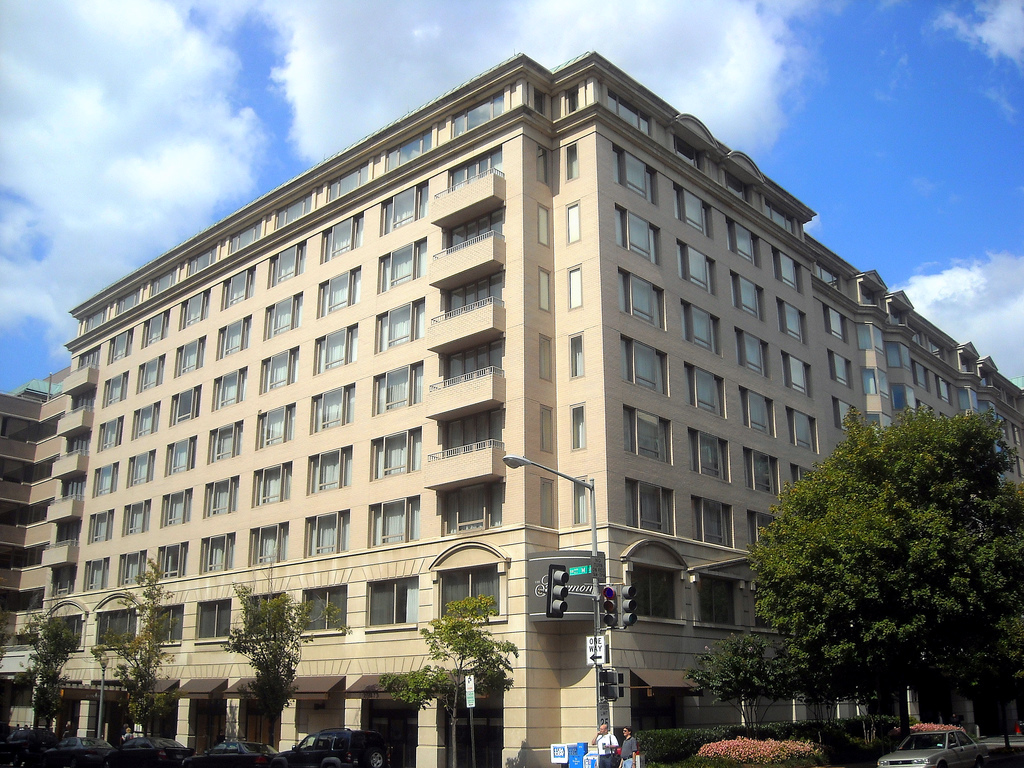
The Westin Hotel at 2401 M Street NW, designed by Koubek.

The 1980s saw the last of Koubek's major projects. In August 1980, ground was broken on the 18-story Hyatt Regency Crystal City hotel (2799 Jefferson Davis Highway) and adjacent 12-story office building (2687 Clark Street) in the Crystal City neighborhood of Arlington County, Virginia. The same year, construction began on Pentagon City I and Pentagon City II—12-story twin office towers built by Rose Associates before the construction of the Fashion Centre at Pentagon City, Pentagon Centre mall, Southampton Condominiums, and Claridge House condominiums. Koubek was also the lead architect for Capitol Place, a 2 acres (0.81 ha), $125 million project at the southeast corner of F Street NW and New Jersey Avenue NW. The project involved the construction of a 13-story office building (now the headquarters of the American Federation of Teachers) and a hotel with a glass atrium (now the Washington Court Hotel). Groundbreaking began in December 1982, by which time another two office buildings (integrated with the first) had been added. In 1983, construction was completed on Koubek's black-glass curtain-walled Union Labor Life Insurance Company headquarters at 111 Massachusetts Avenue NW. (Commonly called the "Darth Vader Building" for its imposing black surface, the company sold the building to developer Douglas Jemal in 2003.) In 1984, Koubek partnered with architect Robert Brannen of Brannen/Jung Associates to design 1615 L Street NW, a 12-story office building with a two-story red brick facade on the ground surmounted by light-green glass and dark-green spandrels on the upper floors. The building was highly praised by The Washington Post for its deeply recessed and double-wide entrance and spectacular, two-story lobby with seven different kinds of polished marble. In 1988, 1615 L Street NW won the Tucker Award of Excellence, "the stone industry's most prestigious award," for its use of stone in the building's lobby and other interiors. In March 1986, Koubek was commissioned to design One Judiciary Square, an 11-story office building on top of the Judiciary Square Metro station. He designed The Westin Hotel (2401 M Street NW) in 1985, a structure which successfully used a greenhouse-like lobby space to "mingle outside with inside". He also designed Shockoe Slip (formerly Shockoe Plaza), a seven-building complex at E. Cary and Governor Streets in Richmond, Virginia.

=== Final works ===
Although by 1990, Koubek Architects was the 12th largest architectural firm in the D.C.-Baltimore area, Koubek personally worked on only a few projects in the 1990s. With John V. Yanik AIA as Associate Architect For Design, Koubek was the Architect of Record for converting the 1919 gymnasium at The Catholic University of America into "The Edward M. Crough Center For Architectural Studies." In 1990, The Washington Chapter of The American Institute of Architects presented a Merit Award to the Center and the Architects "For extraordinary Achievement in Architecture." Although he was not the lead architect on the project, he did the working drawings for the AARP Building at 601 E Street NW. He also did the working drawings for the massive, block-long new headquarters for the International Finance Corporation at 2121 Pennsylvania Avenue NW in 1997.

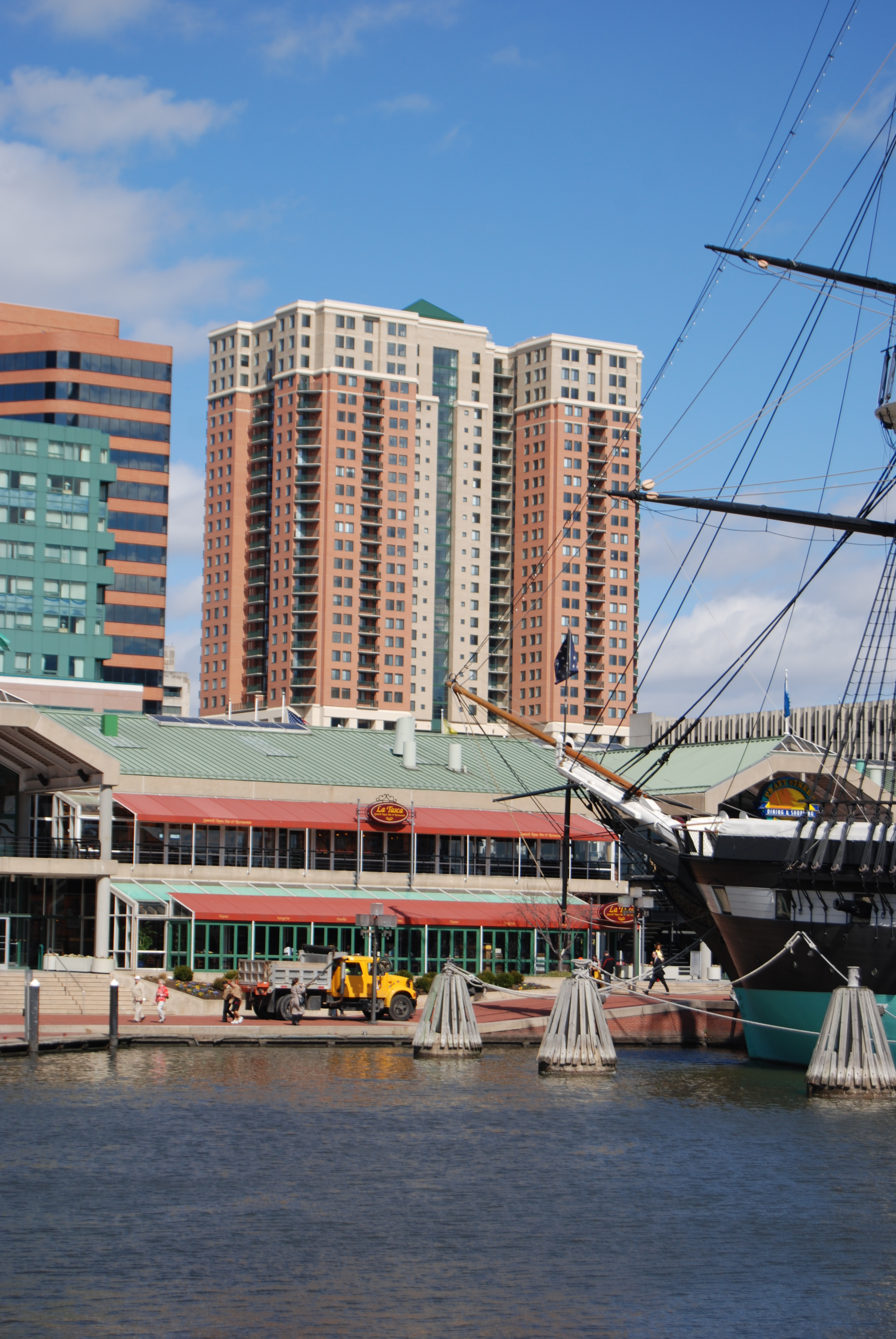
1414 Water Street (the "Water Tower"), one of Koubek's last projects.

Some of his last projects were the renovations to the 13-story, Beaux-Arts Hamilton Crowne Plaza in 1992 (1001 14th Street NW), the 29-story, post-Modernist 100 Harborview Drive condominiums in Baltimore in 1993, and Baltimore's 33-story, post-Modernist Water Tower (414 Water Street) condominiums in 2000 (in association with Sasaki Associates).

== Other activities ==
In addition to his architectural work, Koubek performed civic service as well. He and his wife, Eva, were both highly active in the Czech émigré community in the United States and especially the Washington, D.C., area. In 1990, Czechoslovak President Václav Havel appointed Koubek to a 15-member international board of consultants. In 1969, President Richard Nixon appointed Koubek to serve on an architectural advisory panel to the General Services Administration. In 1984, Koubek served as a consultant to the United States Department of State, inspecting security arrangements at United States Foreign Service housing in Europe and Asia.

Koubek was a nationally known authority on how to draft construction documents for commercial buildings. He became a multi-millionaire through his architectural work and investments.

== Later years and death ==
Although Koubek designed more than 100 apartment buildings, condominiums, hotels, office buildings, and shopping malls during his long career, he did only a handful of private residences. He actively continued his architectural career and office until January 2003. By the time of his death, he had designed buildings representing a combined investment of more than $2 billion.

Vlastimil Koubek's marriage to Eva Koubek ended in divorce. He married Peggy Koubek in 1984. Vlastimil Koubek died of cancer on February 15, 2003, at his home in Arlington, Virginia.

== Design philosophy ==
Koubek's architectural philosophy has been described as cosmetic and practical. Because the height of buildings in D.C. was limited to 130 feet (40 m) by law and the cost of land was so high, buildings in the city were built to the maximum size possible. "There is nothing left for the architect to do except apply the cosmetics," Koubek said. Koubek limited his "cosmetics" to the needs and budgets of his clients, often falling back on the design aesthetics of Marcel Breuer, I. M. Pei, and Ludwig Mies van der Rohe. His work was described as restrained, and an unnamed D.C. city planning official once described Koubek's work as "last year's Skidmore, Owings, and Merrill."

Koubek defended his work from criticisms that it was boxlike, sterile, repetitive, and dull. "Good architecture ... has to fit the fabric of the city and be functional inside and make economic sense. The most wonderful building in the world is not going to get built if it will not make money." Others defended his work as well. Oliver T. Carr, chairman of the giant real estate developer CarrAmerica, said, "He was good. He was different from so many architects of that time. His buildings had clean architectural lines, and yet they were functional and practical and offered good work space. For that period of time, he was a perfect fit."

Koubek did not like mixing older, smaller buildings with his designs. "There is no place for big buildings next to little buildings," he told The Washington Post in 1979. He was also critical of Federalist architecture. He once scathingly noted, "I think that on Georgetown architecture I'd rather not comment at all. You may quote me on that. I wish you would."

== Legacy ==
The Koubek Auditorium in the Edward M. Crough Center for Architectural Studies at Catholic University of America is named for Koubek in honor of his many contributions to architectural design.

Among Koubek's most notable buildings are:

- American Automobile Association (former headquarters in Fairfax, Virginia)
- International Finance Corporation headquarters
- International Square
- L'Enfant Plaza Hotel
- Motion Picture Association of America headquarters
- USF&G Building (now the Transamerica Tower)
- World Bank Annex

== Bibliography ==
- Andelson, Robert V. Land-Value Taxation Around the World. Malden, Mass.: Blackwell Publishing, 2000.
- Carrier, Thomas J. Historic Georgetown: A Walking Tour. Charleston, S.C.: Arcadia, 1999.
- Evelyn, Douglas E.; Dickson, Paul; and Ackerman, S.J. On This Spot: Pinpointing the Past in Washington, D.C. Sterling, Va.: Capital Books, 2008.
- Hodges, Allan A. and Hodges, Carol A. Washington on Foot: 23 Walking Tours of Washington, D.C., Old Town Alexandria, Virginia, and Historic Annapolis, Maryland. Washington, D.C.: Smithsonian Institution Press, 1980.
- Kousoulas, Claudia D. and Kousoulas, George W. Contemporary Architecture in Washington, D.C. Washington, D.C.: Preservation Press, 1995.
- Moeller, Gerard M. AIA Guide to the Architecture of Washington, D.C. Baltimore: Johns Hopkins University Press, 2006.
- Scott, Pamela and Lee, Antoinette Josephine. Buildings of the District of Columbia. Oxford: Oxford University Press, 1993.
- Williams, Paul Kelsey. Southwest Washington, D.C. Charleston, S.C.: Arcadia, 2005.
