= Isaac Huntzberger =

American football player and coach (1873–1927)

Biographical details
- Born: March 26, 1873; Elizabethtown, Pennsylvania, U.S.
- Died: September 14, 1927 (aged 54); Friendship Heights, Maryland, U.S.

Playing career
- 1897–1898: Lebanon Valley

Coaching career (HC unless noted)
- 1897: Lebanon Valley

Isaac Witman Huntzberger (March 26, 1873 – September 14, 1927) was an American football player and coach. He served as a player-coach at Lebanon Valley College in Annville, Pennsylvania in 1897.
