= 100 Light Street =

Skyscraper in Baltimore, Maryland, U.S.

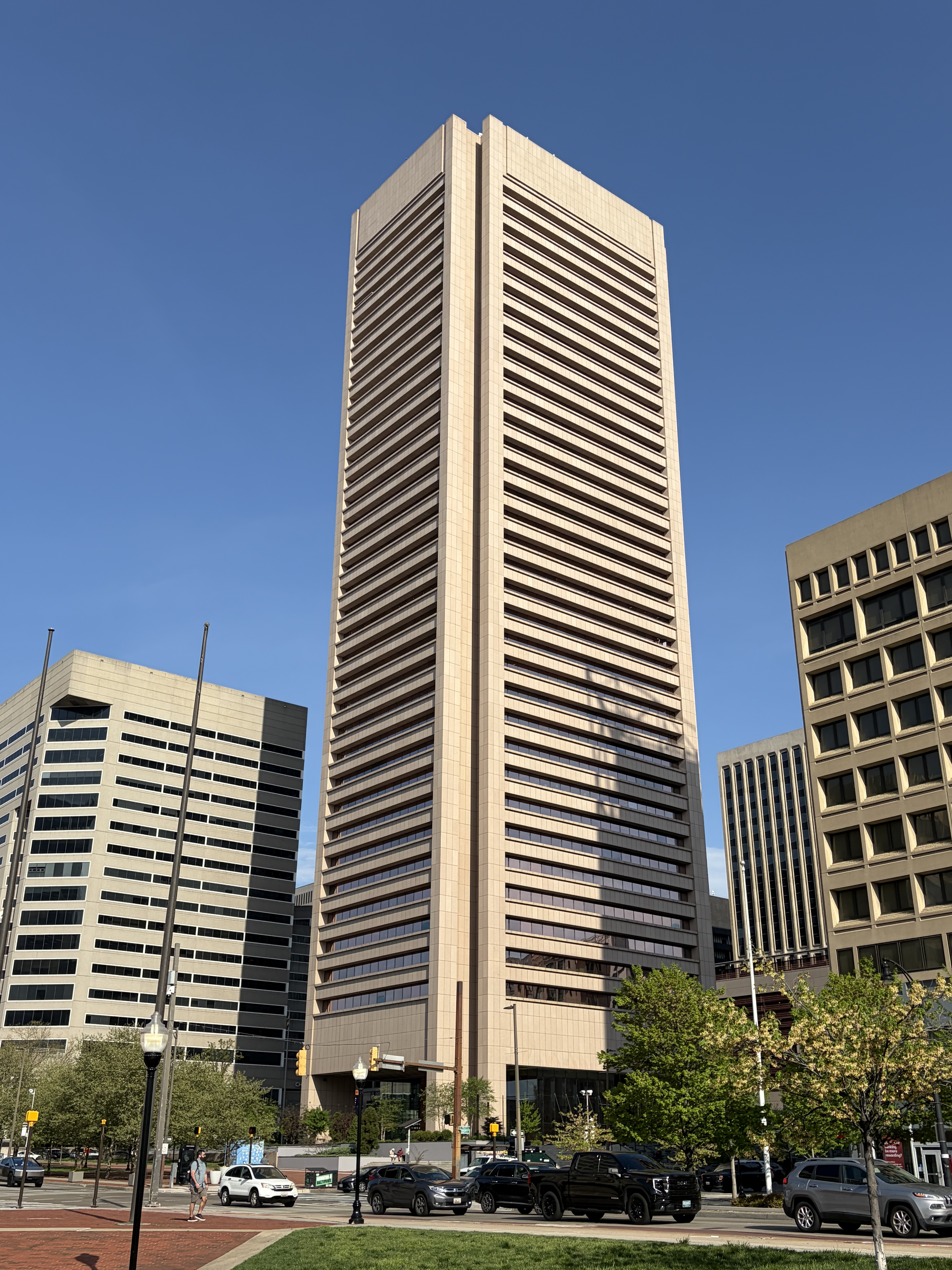
- 100 Light Street in April 2026

- Location within Baltimore
- Former names: U.S. Fidelity & Guaranty Building; USF&G Tower (1973–mid 1990s); Legg Mason Building (1997–2009); Transamerica Tower (2011–2023)

General information
- Type: Mixed-use
- Location: 100 Light Street (between Light, East Lombard, South Charles and East Pratt Streets), Baltimore, Maryland
- Coordinates: 39°17′14.2″N 76°36′52.0″W
- Construction started: 1971
- Completed: December 31, 1973
- Owner: COPT
- Operator: COPT

Height
- Roof: 528 ft (161 m)

Technical details
- Floor count: 40
- Floor area: 529,993 sq ft (49,238.0 m^{2})

Design and construction
- Architect: Vlastimil Koubek & Associates
- Developer: USF&G
- Engineer: Robert Kylberg (civil)
- Main contractor: Huber Hunt & Nichols

Website
- 100light.com

100 Light Street (colloquially known by its most recent former label, the Transamerica Tower) is a 40-story, 528 ft (161 m) skyscraper completed in 1973 in downtown Baltimore, Maryland. It occupies the city block bounded by South Charles (Maryland Route 139), East Lombard, Light and East Pratt Streets. It is the tallest building in Baltimore and in Maryland.

Originally built as the USF&G Building, it was the headquarters of the United States Fidelity and Guarantee Company (USF&G) in Baltimore, Maryland. USF&G, a specialized insurance company founded in Baltimore in 1896, relocated here from its former complex of three adjoining early 20th Century masonry structures at the southwest corner of South Calvert and Redwood (formerly German Street before World War I) Streets. Later occupied by and known as the Legg Mason Building, the structure faces the former "The Basin" of the Helen Delich Bentley Port of Baltimore on the Northwest Branch of the Patapsco River and the Inner Harbor downtown business waterfront redevelopment.

== History ==
The tower was one of the first skyscrapers to be constructed using a then-revolutionary method of erecting a towering central reinforced concrete column first containing elevators and service infrastructure conduits and then followed later by the surrounding scaffolding or steel horizontal beams rising floor by floor, and was a magnet for "sidewalk superintendents" and passing office workers during its construction during the early 70's. Overlooking the new harborfront parkland and expanded bulkheads of former Sam Smith Park with newly rebuilt/repaved Light and Pratt Streets with median strips and landscaped tree-lined sidewalks focused on a brick waterside promenade, soon to be anchored by the historic sailing U.S. Navy warship, USS Constellation (originally thought to be from 1797, later documented as 1854) with "Constellation Dock" replacing old Municipal Pier 1. Later surrounded by an enormous surrounding plazas rising above a series of steps on the lower south and east sides of the block paved with pink stone panels with terraced garden plots with shrubbery at the edges. A few years later, the construction of Harborplace shopping pavilions with a new waterfall fountain in renamed McKeldin Square (renamed for former Mayor and Governor Theodore R. McKeldin), reached by crossing-over the adjacent streets by pedestrian bridges and a central amphitheater facing the water and the ships. Within a decade, the new tower was surrounded by additional glass and aluminum office buildings, hotels, and shopping/commercial high-rises.

Construction of the new rising tower challenged for the first time forty years the "tallest tower" ranking held since its 1929 completion of the art deco-styled former Baltimore Trust Company Building, (which later went bankrupt shortly after its completion after the Great Wall Street Stock Market Crash of October 1929), then assumed several other names before bearing the title of the Maryland National Bank of the reorganized old B.T.C., by the 1960s soon the largest banking chain in the state.

USF&G built the 35-story tower, selling it when they were purchased by the St. Paul Companies, which is now a unit of The Travelers Companies. Despite its own changes of owners and names, the former USF&G Building remains the tallest building in Baltimore, the tallest building in Maryland, and the tallest building between Philadelphia and Raleigh after the completion of RBC Plaza in 2008. It was also the former home of Legg Mason investment and financial advisors after leaving its former headquarters at the Harborplace Office Tower. Legg Mason later relocated to a newer headquarters on the eastern side of downtown in Harbor East.

The building was renamed the Transamerica Tower in November 2011 when Transamerica became the largest tenant of the building, moving there from its nationally known former headquarters in San Francisco, the iconic landmark Transamerica Pyramid which appears in the company's logo at the top of the building. The building was again put on sale in early 2015.

In February 2023, Transamerica downsized and left the building, ending their lease and forfeiting the naming rights. While some Baltimoreans still refer to the building as "Transamerica Tower", the Transamerica name from the building was removed, and Transamerica relocated to a smaller space at Wills Wharf at Harbor Point. Following this, the building's name was reverted to its address.

== Occupants and ownership changes ==
USF&G remained in the building until the mid-1990s. The building's primary occupant was asset manager Legg Mason, Inc., until 2009. In February 2007, Legg Mason announced that it would be moving to a new skyscraper in the Harbor East southeastern waterfront development, a move that was completed during summer 2009. As of 2010, the "Legg Mason" sign was no longer at the top of the Pratt and Light Streets building.

In 2009, the building became home to the Baltimore branch of RBC Wealth Management.

In spring 2011, the building also became home to Baltimore-based law firm Ober|Kaler (now Baker Donelson). The firm occupies 6 floors of the building.

In November 2011, the building became the headquarters of Transamerica.

In April 2013, the building became the home of the Mid-Atlantic law firm Miles & Stockbridge P.C.

Around 1978, a peregrine falcon made its home on a balcony on the building's 33rd floor. Every year since then, a pair of falcons have returned to the building to nest and fledge a set of chicks.

== See also ==
- List of tallest buildings in Baltimore
- List of tallest buildings by U.S. state and territory
- Baltimore
- History of Baltimore
- Timeline of Baltimore history
- Charles Center
- Inner Harbor
- USF&G
