= Hilton Washington DC National Mall =

Hotel in Washington, D.C.

Hilton Washington DC National Mall The Wharf
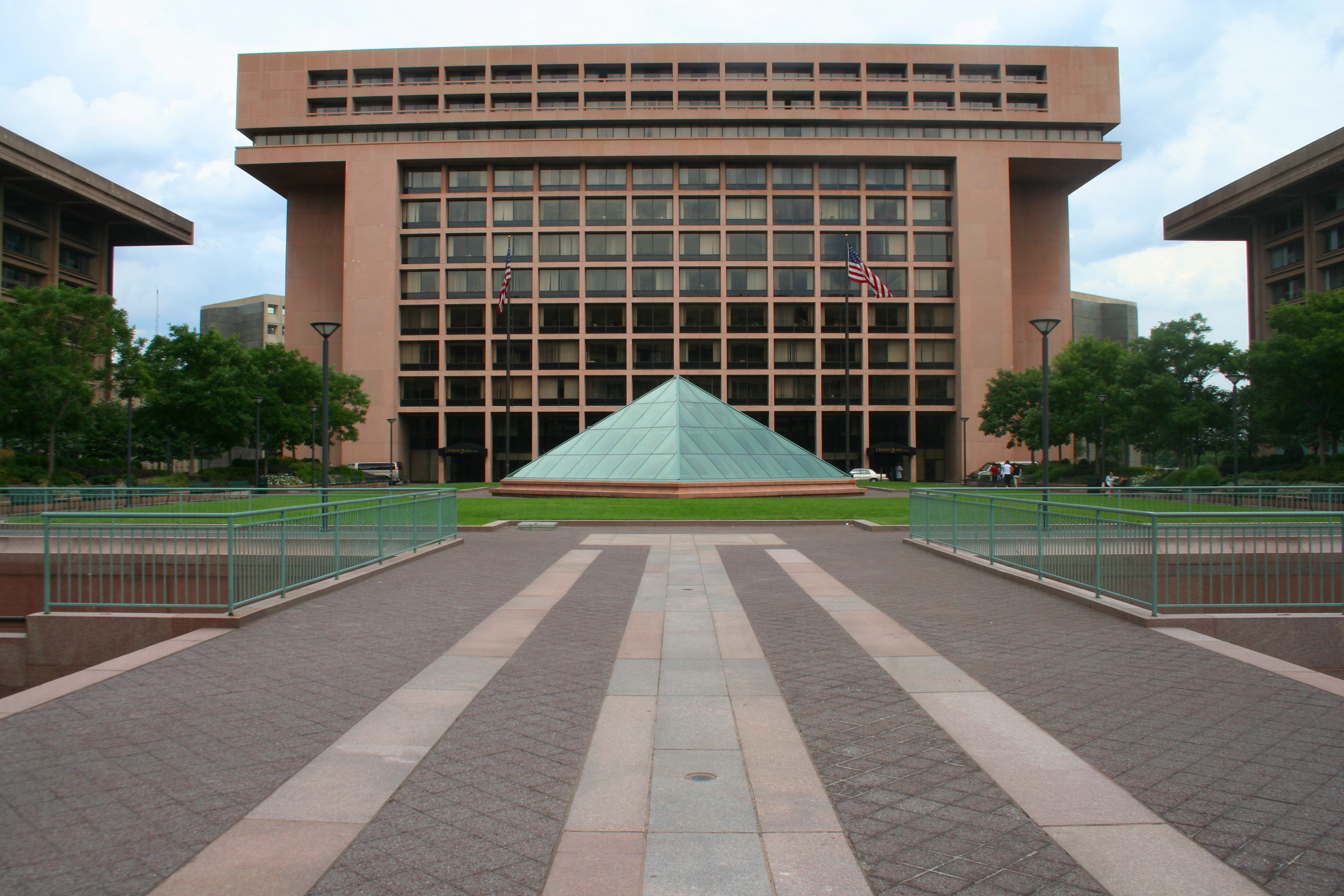
- Looking east across L'Enfant Plaza at the Hilton Washington DC National Mall

- Location within Washington, D.C.

General information
- Location: 480 L'Enfant Plaza SW, Washington, D.C., U.S.
- Coordinates: 38.8839615°N 77.0246486°W
- Opening: May 31, 1973
- Owner: L'Enfant DC Hotel LLC
- Management: Hilton Hotels

Technical details
- Floor count: 6 (building: 12)

Design and construction
- Architect: Vlastimil Koubek
- Developer: L'Enfant Plaza Corp. and Loews Hotels

Other information
- Number of rooms: 367
- Number of suites: 10
- Number of restaurants: 2

Website
- www3.hilton.com/en/hotels/district-of-columbia/hilton-washington-dc-national-mall-DCAEPHH/index.html

The Hilton Washington DC National Mall The Wharf, previously known as the L'Enfant Plaza Hotel, is a 367-room hotel located on the top four floors of a 12-story mixed-use building at the L'Enfant Plaza complex in the Southwest Federal Center neighborhood of Washington, D.C., United States. It was designed by architect Vlastimil Koubek, and was opened on May 31, 1973, as the Loews L'Enfant Plaza Hotel, named after Pierre Charles L'Enfant, the first surveyor and designer of the street layout of the city.

The hotel sits atop L'Enfant Plaza, an esplanade and plaza structure erected above a highway and a parking garage. The plaza and hotel were approved in 1955, but construction did not begin on the plaza (on which the hotel sits) until 1965. The plaza and esplanade were completed in 1968. The start of construction on the hotel was delayed three years, and was completed in May 1973. The construction led to a lawsuit after it was found that the foundation of an adjoining structure had encroached on the hotel's property. The hotel suffered a serious fire in 1975 that claimed the lives of two people.

L'Enfant Plaza Corp., which owned the hotel, sold the structure to Sarakreek Holdings in 1998, which in turn sold it to the JBG Companies in 2003. A legal battle ensued over the hotel's ownership. The hotel's original operator, Loews Hotels, was replaced after thirty-two years by Crestline Hotels & Resorts in 2005, which was in turn replaced by the Davidson Hotel Company in 2010. The hotel closed on December 3, 2013, for what was originally intended to be a year-long overhaul and upgrade of the entire property. It reopened on April 1, 2019, as the Hilton Washington DC National Mall.

== History ==
=== Construction ===
==== Building L'Enfant Plaza ====
In 1946, the United States Congress passed the District of Columbia Redevelopment Act, which established the District of Columbia Redevelopment Land Agency and provided for clearance of land and redevelopment funds in the capital. After a decade of discussion, public comment, legal battles, and negotiations with landowners and developers, the Southwest Urban Renewal Plan was approved in November 1956. New York City developer William Zeckendorf proposed a grand mall along 10th Street SW, extending from Independence Avenue SW to end at a traffic circle at G Street SW. Zeckendorf named this mall L'Enfant Plaza after Pierre Charles L'Enfant, an architect responsible for planning the city of Washington. L'Enfant Plaza was approved for construction in April 1955. In December 1959, Zeckendorf won approval to build a 1,000-room hotel and five privately owned office buildings on L'Enfant Plaza. The Redevelopment Land Agency also approved the condemnation and razing of 14 city blocks for construction of the plaza, hotel, and office buildings. Construction was to have begun on January 1, 1961, but was delayed due to unresolved design issues with L'Enfant Promenade, the short time-frame to prepare detailed construction plans, and because Congress had not granted air rights above 9th Street SW to the developers.

Construction of L'Enfant Plaza and the hotel were then delayed another decade. Zeckendorf agreed to build the promenade, plaza, and all surrounding buildings as a single project in April 1961 and to pay $20 per 1 square foot (0.093 m^{2}). These pledges led the Redevelopment Land Agency to award the 14-block area to Zeckendorf in October 1961 for $7 million. By this time, although the hotel had retained its size, the number of office buildings had shrunk from eight to three. Zeckendorf added an underground shopping mall of shops and restaurants to the project in November 1962, and construction on the promenade and plaza was to have begun in April 1963. But Zeckendorf's vast real estate empire began to suffer severe financial difficulties in 1964, eventually going bankrupt the following year. With Zeckendorf unable to make good on his construction pledges, the Redevelopment Land Agency forced him to withdraw and sell his interest in L'Enfant Plaza in November 1964.

The buyer of Zeckendorf's property and leases was the L'Enfant Plaza Corp. (also known as L'Enfant Properties). L'Enfant Plaza Corp. was a syndicate led by former United States Air Force Lieutenant General Elwood R. Quesada, and included Chase Manhattan Bank president David Rockefeller, D.C., businessman David A. Garrett, investment banker André Meyer, and the real estate investment firm Gerry Brothers & Co. Quesada said that if the Redevelopment Land Agency approved the sale, it would begin immediate construction of the promenade, the 1,400-car parking garage beneath it, and the plaza. The agency gave its approval on January 21, 1965. The sale was final on August 30.

Site preparation for L'Enfant promenade and plaza began in November 1965. Air rights over 9th Street SW were granted for a rent of $500 per year for 99 years on November 23, 1965. The actual groundbreaking for L'Enfant Plaza occurred on December 9 but the project was still hindered by delays. The federal government was building the James V. Forrestal Building at the northern end of L'Enfant promenade, and the whole northern end of the promenade and the associated roadway was a year behind its construction schedule by June 1967. Meanwhile, over-optimistic construction schedules and labor shortages meant L'Enfant Plaza Corp's building of the North and South buildings were six months behind projected schedules. The $23 million complex neared completion in January 1968, and the office buildings, plaza, and promenade opened to the public and businesses in June 1968. The plaza was formally dedicated on Saturday, November 16, 1968.

The west office building and the hotel remained to be built, at a cost of $40 million. Construction on the 640,000 square feet (59,000 m^{2}) West Building and 730-car parking garage (designed by D.C. architect Vlastimil Koubek) began on February 18, 1969.

==== Building the hotel ====
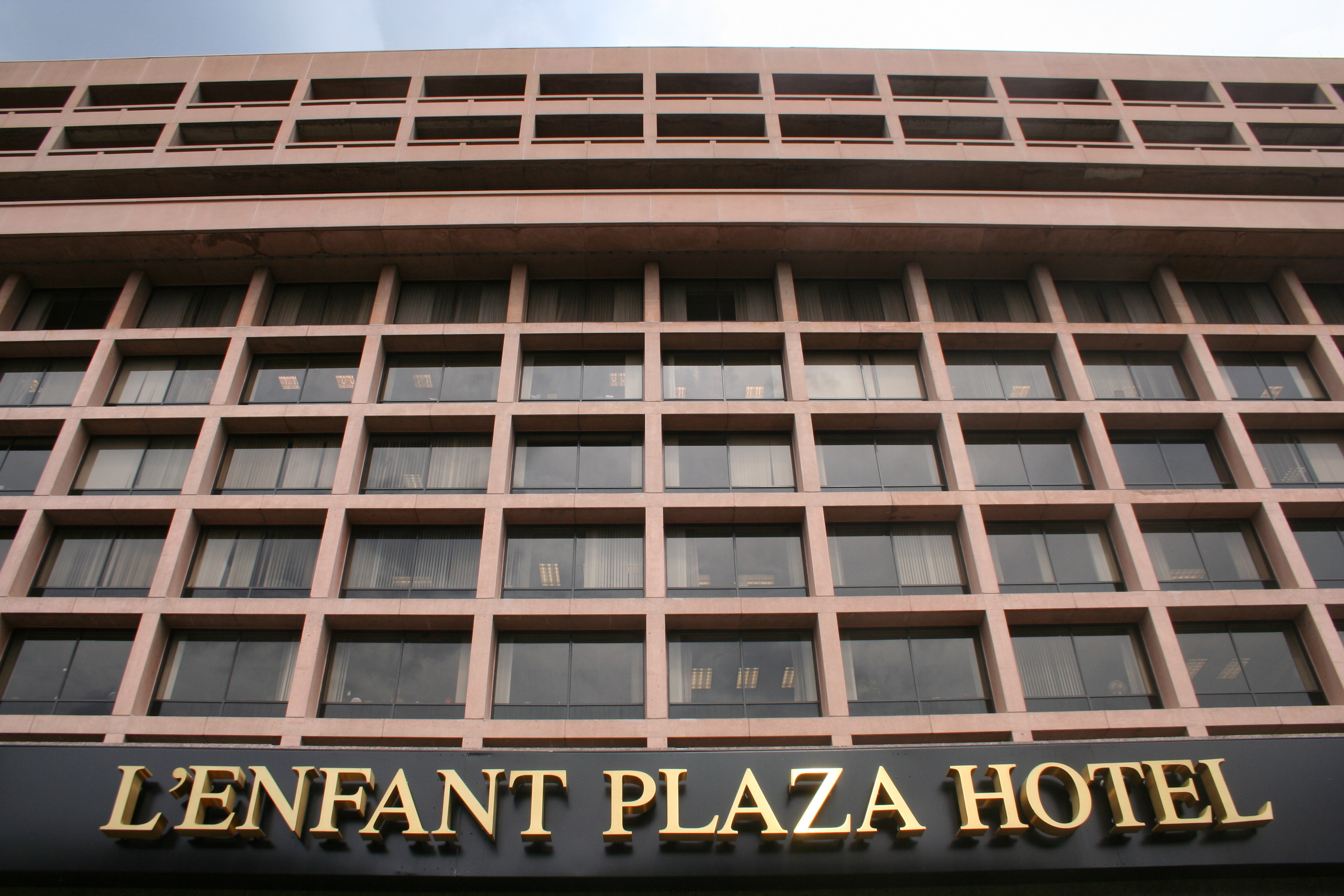
Facade

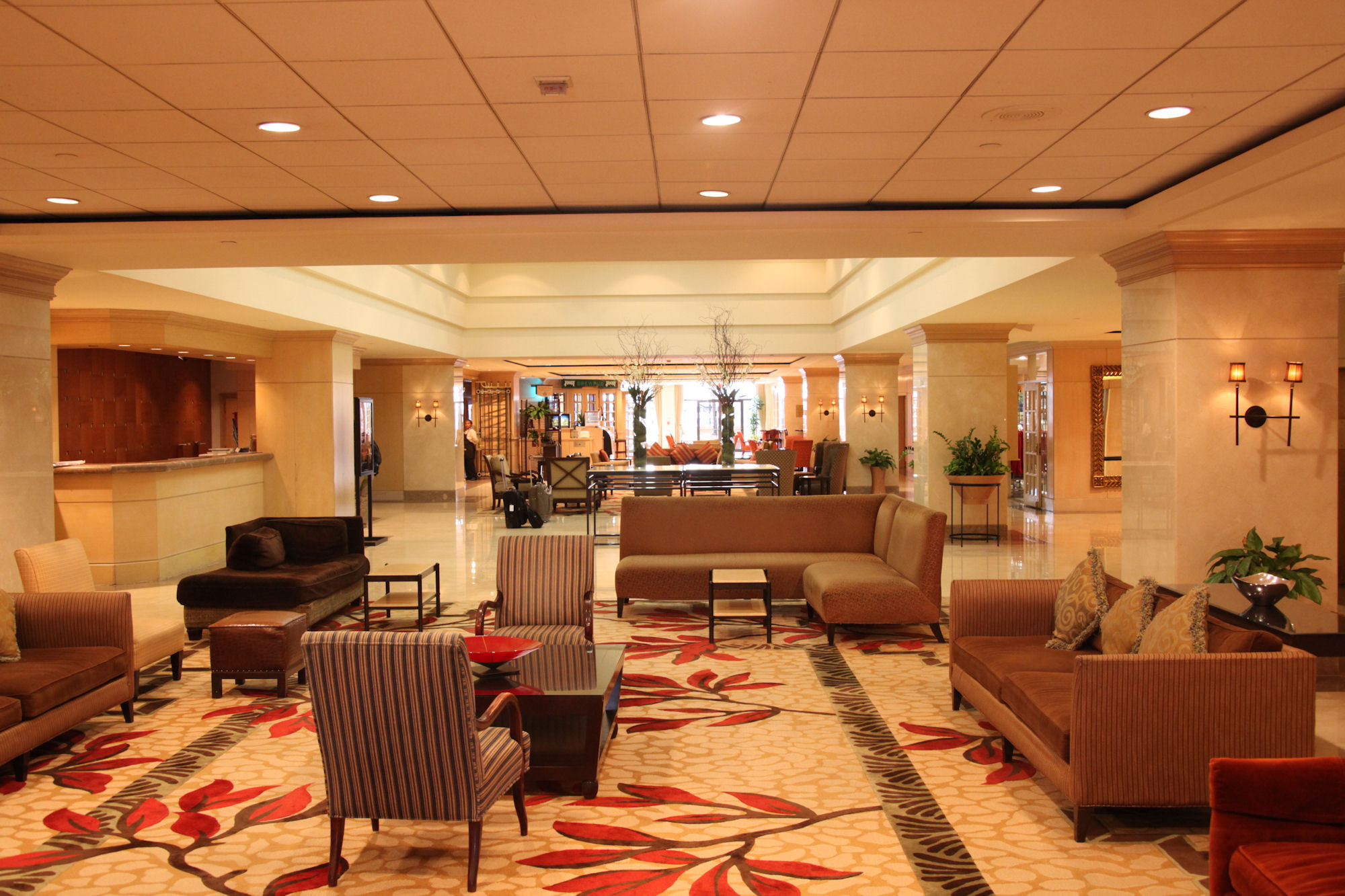
Lobby

Construction on the Modernist hotel was to have started in the spring of 1970. However, construction on the 1 million square feet (93,000 m^{2}), $23 million hotel and office building did not begin until June 1971. The Loews Hotels chain agreed to co-finance construction of the property with L'Enfant Plaza Corp., although details of the agreement were not provided. The hotel would occupy the top four floors and lobby of the 12-story building, with separate elevators for office tenants and hotel guests. The 378-room hotel, designed by Koubek, had a rooftop swimming pool, two restaurants, a cocktail lounge, and meeting rooms. The general contractor for the building was George Hyman Construction Co. (now Clark Construction Group).

A major problem emerged during the hotel's construction. The Robert C. Weaver Federal Building, headquarters of the United States Department of Housing and Urban Development (HUD), had been constructed on a Redevelopment Land Agency site in November 1965. John McShain, Inc., one of the largest federal building contractors in the Washington metro area, was the lead construction contractor. During the HUD building's construction, the footings for the western portion of the building were accidentally built 1.5 to 3.5 feet (0.46 to 1.07 m) over the property line. The 3 feet (0.91 m)-thick footings for the HUD building were 23 feet (7.0 m) underground. L'Enfant Plaza Corp. sued John McShain, Inc. and the Redevelopment Land Agency for removal of the footings, stabilization of the HUD structure, and associated costs. The action spawned several lengthy court battles which lasted through the 1970s.

The Loews L'Enfant Plaza Hotel opened with a three-day gala ending with its dedication on May 31, 1973. The festivities began on May 29 with a birthday party for author Anita Loos attended by 260 Loews' executives, celebrities, and press—including actress Carol Channing singing "Diamonds Are A Girl's Best Friend" while seated on top of a 5 feet (1.5 m) tall cake. More than 1,500 people including Senator J. William Fulbright, Senator Jacob Javits, former Secretary of Defense Clark Clifford, and numerous business people, bankers, merchants, and construction company executives attended a reception at the hotel on May 30, and were permitted to roam freely throughout the facility throughout the evening. On May 31, Mayor of the District of Columbia Walter Washington, flanked by the Thomas Jefferson High School marching band and 40 high-kicking high school majorettes, cut the ribbon formally opening the hotel. The finished hotel had 372 rooms and occupied the bottom two "lobby floors" and the top four floors of the building. The building's final cost was $30 million.

=== Operation ===
Quesada and the Rockefeller family each owned about 39 percent of L'Enfant Plaza Corp. Major Rockefeller investors included David Rockefeller, David Rockefeller, Jr., and Abby Rockefeller Mauzé.

The hotel suffered a serious fire in 1975. On February 10, a fire broke out in a 12th floor storeroom which killed a hotel maid and injured three others. A hotel waiter died the following day. An important national conference was also held at the hotel by the American government in 1980. In the late 1980s a supposed secret meeting was held at the hotel by three Republicans—Richard V. Allen, Laurence H. Silberman and Robert McFarlane—with an Iranian emissary. From its opening until May 2005, the hotel was managed by Loews Hotels. For the next five years, it was managed by Crestline Hotels & Resorts, but the Davidson Hotel Company assumed control of its operations in July 2010.

In September 1996, the Dutch Company Sarakreek Holdings NV (a real estate investment firm), Sarakreek Holding N.V. (itself a subsidiary of the Tiger/Westbrook Real Estate Fund of New York City), purchased the hotel and all but the West Building at L'Enfant Plaza for $185 million.

In November 2003, the JBG Companies purchased L'Enfant Plaza, the L'Enfant Plaza Hotel, and the North and South office buildings from the Sarakreek Holdings for $200 million. The following year, the JBG Companies upgraded the hotel's physical plant, and added a Louvre Pyramid-like structure to the plaza in front of the hotel. This was designed by the architect I.M. Pei.

=== Ownership lawsuit ===
As part of Sarakreek's 1997 purchase of most of the L'Enfant Plaza complex, Sarakreek put the L'Enfant Plaza Hotel up for sale. Stanford Hotels Corporation, a privately owned firm, successfully bid $48 million for the structure. After a definitive sale agreement was reached in 1998, Sarakreek backed out of the deal. Hotels Stanford sued in the Superior Court of the District of Columbia. In Stanford Hotels Corporation v. Potomac Creek Associates (CAB-1413-99, 1999), Superior Court Judge Leonard Braman ruled that Sarakreek was not in breach of contract. Stanford Hotels appealed. Various motions delayed the appellate hearing until 2009.

In 2011, the District of Columbia Court of Appeals overturned the ruling of the Superior Court. The case was remanded to the Superior Court with orders to determine whether specific performance was warranted.

Subsequently, after a second trial, Judge Braman ruled on July 31, 2013, that Sarakreek was in violation of its preliminary 1998 agreement to sell. The JBG Cos. was ordered to sell the L'Enfant Plaza Hotel to L'Enfant DC Hotel LLC. L'Enfant DC Hotel LLC submitted its offer to buy to the court on August 9.

=== 2013 closure ===
L'Enfant DC Hotel LLC announced on October 18, 2013, that it expected to close on the sale of the hotel on December 3, 2013. The company said it would immediately shut down the hotel, and engage in a year-long renovation. The hotel was not accepting any reservations that extended past December 2, 2013. Hotel industry experts told the Washington Business Journal that the hotel had many years' worth of deferred maintenance. The JBG Cos. had spent only about $2 million in maintenance from 2005 to 2013, and Stanford Corp. estimated the property needed at least $28 million in modernizations. L'Enfant DC Hotel LLC also agreed to the honor the collective bargaining agreement which The JBG Cos. had with UNITE HERE Local 25. About 125 to 135 people, most of them with 20 years of job tenure at the L'Enfant Plaza Hotel, were affected by the closure. The labor union said it was in discussion with L'Enfant DC Hotel LLC to win the company's guarantee that the workers would be rehired and that the company would honor the workers' collective bargaining agreement when the hotel reopened.

In January 2014, L'Enfant DC Hotel LLC said it would spend $40 million beginning in the spring of 2014 to renovate all meeting space and the fitness facility, lobby, pool, and restaurants at the facility. The hotel ultimately was closed for six years, and it reopened on April 1, 2019, as the Hilton Washington DC National Mall following a $30 million renovation. Within a year of the hotel's reopening, contractors had placed more than $14 million in liens on the building.

== Facilities ==
The hotel was listed as a Mobile 4-star and AAA 4-Diamond Luxury Hotel. It was reported to be extremely expensive, with a high standard of formal attire expected. The hotel features 372 guest rooms, 36 larger "Executive Rooms", and several suites on the top four floors of a 12-story mixed-use building. Lonely Planet describes the hotel as "huge and stylish". The ground floor is occupied by the hotel's lobby, with separate elevators for hotel guests and office tenants. The L'Enfant Plaza hotel had two main restaurants: The American Grill and the Foggy Brew Pub. The facility had 21,000 square feet (2,000 m^{2}) of meeting room space, which includes a main ballroom which seats 700. It also featured two bars, concierge, a health club, and an outdoor pool.

== Bibliography ==
- Committee on the District of Columbia. Subcommittee on Fiscal and Government Affairs. Amend Redevelopment Act of 1945 and Transfer U.S. Real Property to RLA: Hearings and Markups Before the Subcommittee on Fiscal and Government Affairs and the Committee on the District of Columbia. U.S. House of Representatives. 95th Congress, Second Session. Washington, D.C.: U.S. Government Printing Office, 1978.
- Gutheim, Frederick Albert and Lee, Antoinette Josephine. Worthy of the Nation: Washington, D.C., From L'Enfant to the National Capital Planning Commission. 2d ed. Baltimore: Johns Hopkins University Press, 2006.
- Hodges, Allan A. and Hodges, Carol A. Washington on Foot: 23 Walking Tours of Washington, D.C., Old Town Alexandria, Virginia, and Historic Annapolis, Maryland. Washington, D.C.: Smithsonian Institution Press, 1980.
- Kousoulas, Claudia D. and Kousoulas, George W. Contemporary Architecture in Washington, D.C. Washington, D.C.: Preservation Press, 1995.
- Moeller, Gerard M. and Weeks, Christopher. AIA Guide to the Architecture of Washington, D.C. Baltimore: Johns Hopkins University Press, 2006.
- Reich, Cary. Financier: The Biography of André Meyer: A Story of Money, Power, and the Reshaping of American Business. New York: Wiley, 1997.
- Resnick, Abraham. They Too Influenced a Nation's History: The Unique Contributions of 105 Lesser-Known Americans. Bloomington, Indiana: iUniverse, 2003.
- Rubin, Beth. Frommer's Washington D.C. With Kids. Hoboken, N.J.: Wiley, 2012.
- Scott, Pamela and Lee, Antoinette Josephine. Buildings of the District of Columbia. Oxford: Oxford University Press, 1993.
- Williams, Paul Kelsey. Southwest Washington, D.C. Charleston, S.C.: Arcadia, 2005.
- Yenckel, Jim, and Frommer, Pauline. Pauline Frommer's Washington, D.C. Hoboken, N.J.: Wiley, 2007.
