= Village (United States) =

Administrative division at the local government level in the United States

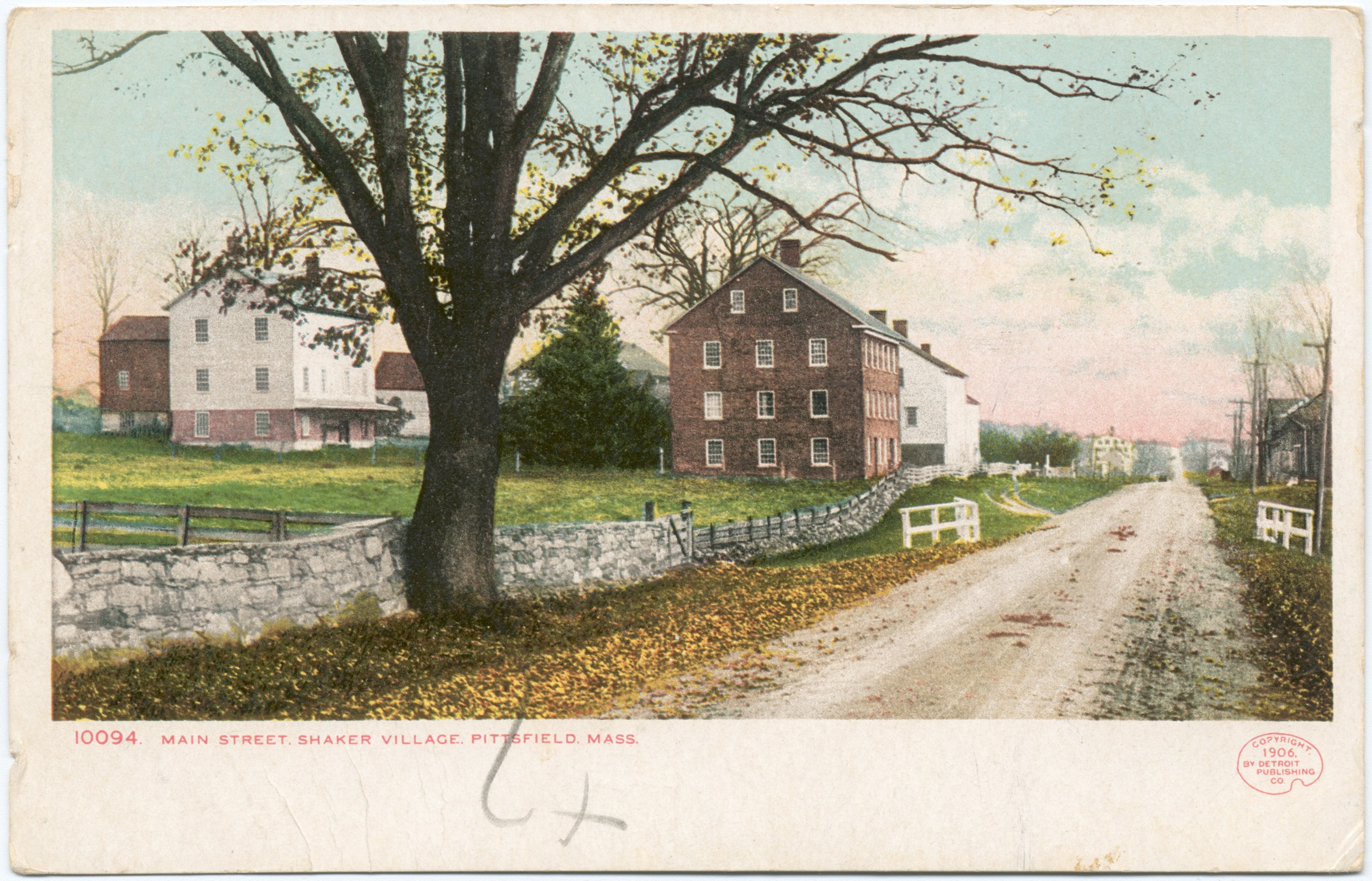
A Shaker village's main street in Massachusetts.

In the United States, the meaning of village varies by geographic area and legal jurisdiction. In formal usage, a "village" is a type of administrative division at the local government level. Since the Tenth Amendment to the United States Constitution prohibits the federal government from legislating on local government, the states are free to have political subdivisions called "villages" or not to and to define the word in many ways. Typically, a village is a type of municipality, although it can also be a special district or an unincorporated area. It may or may not be recognized for governmental purposes.

In informal usage, a U.S. village may be simply a relatively small clustered human settlement without formal legal existence. In colonial New England, a village typically formed around the meetinghouses that were located in the center of each town. Many of these colonial settlements still exist as town centers. With the advent of the Industrial Revolution, industrial villages also sprang up around water-powered mills, mines, and factories. Because most New England villages were contained within the boundaries of legally established towns, many such villages were never separately incorporated as municipalities.

A relatively small unincorporated community, similar to a hamlet in New York state, or even a relatively small community within an incorporated city or town, may be termed a village. This informal usage may be found even in states that have villages as incorporated municipalities and is similar to the usage of the term "unincorporated town" in states having town governments.

States that formally recognize villages vary widely in the definition of the term. Most commonly, a village is either a special district or a municipality. As a municipality, a village may

1. differ from a city or town in terms of population;
2. differ from a city in terms of dependence on a township; or
3. be virtually equivalent to a city or town.

== By state ==
=== Alaska ===
Under Article 10, Section 2 of the Alaska Constitution, as well as law enacted pursuant to the constitution, Alaska legally recognizes only cities and boroughs as municipal entities in Alaska. In Alaska, "village" is a colloquial term used to refer to small communities, which are mostly located in the rural areas of the state, often unconnected to the contiguous North American road system. Many of these communities are populated predominantly by Alaska Natives and are federally recognized as villages under the Indian Reorganization Act and/or the Alaska Native Claims Settlement Act. As voting membership in the Alaska Municipal League is on an equal footing, regardless of population, most villages are incorporated as second-class cities. In common usage, however, these communities are thought of more often as villages than as cities.

=== Connecticut ===
Village districts are subordinate agencies of municipal governments rather than municipalities in their own right.

=== Delaware ===
Municipalities in Delaware are called cities, towns, or villages. There are no differences among them that would affect their classification for census purposes.

=== Florida ===
Municipalities in Florida are called cities, towns, or villages. They are not differentiated for census purposes.

=== Idaho ===
All municipalities in Idaho are called cities, although the terms "town" and "village" are sometimes used in statutes.

=== Illinois ===
A village is a type of incorporated municipality in Illinois; the other two types are the city and the incorporated town. All incorporated municipalities, regardless of type, are independent of each other, and cannot overlap. Villages can be created by referendum under the general state law or by special state charter. The governing body is a board of six elected trustees and an elected village president, all of whom are usually elected at-large.

=== Louisiana ===
A village in Louisiana is a municipality having a population of 1,000 or fewer.

=== Maine ===
In Maine, village corporations or village improvement corporations are special districts established in towns for limited purposes.

=== Maryland ===
In Maryland, a locality designated "Village of ..." may be either an incorporated town or a special tax district. An example of the latter is the Village of Friendship Heights. The distinction is legally relevant to the level of police power that a village may exercise.

=== Michigan ===
In Michigan, villages differ from cities in that, whereas villages remain part of the townships in which they are formed, thereby reducing their home-rule powers, cities are not part of townships. Because of this, village governments are required to share some of the responsibilities to their residents with the township.

=== Minnesota ===
Villages that existed in Minnesota as of January 1, 1974, became cities, which may operate under general municipal law ("statutory city") or adopt a charter for itself to become a charter city.

=== Mississippi ===
A village in Mississippi is a municipality of 100 to 299 inhabitants. They may no longer be created.

=== Missouri ===
The municipalities of Missouri are cities, towns, and villages. Unlike cities, villages have no minimum population requirement.

=== Nebraska ===
In Nebraska, a village is a municipality of 100 through 800 inhabitants, whereas a city must have at least 800 inhabitants. In counties having townships, all villages, but only some cities, are within township areas. A city of the second class (800–5,000 inhabitants) may elect to revert to village status.

=== New Hampshire ===
In New Hampshire, a village district or precinct may be organized within a town. Such a village district or precinct is a special district with limited powers.

=== New Jersey ===
A village in the context of New Jersey local government, refers to one of five types and one of eleven forms of municipal government. Villages in New Jersey are of equal standing to other municipalities, such as cities, towns, boroughs, and townships.

=== New Mexico ===
The municipalities in New Mexico are cities, towns, and villages. There are no differences among them that would affect their classification for census purposes.

=== New York ===
In New York, a village is an incorporated area that differs from a city in that a village is within the jurisdiction of one or more towns, whereas a city is independent of a town. Villages thus have less autonomy than cities.

A village is usually, but not always, within a single town. A village may be coterminous with, and have a consolidated government with, a town. A village is a clearly defined municipality that provides the services closest to the residents, such as garbage collection, street and highway maintenance, street lighting and building codes. Some villages provide their own police and other optional services. Those municipal services not provided by the village are provided by the town or towns containing the village. As of the 2000 census, there are 553 villages in New York.

There is no limit to the population of a village in New York; Hempstead, the largest village in the state, has 55,000 residents, making it more populous than some of the state's cities. However, villages in the state may not exceed five square miles (13 km^{2}) in area. Present law requires a minimum of 500 residents to incorporate as a village.

=== North Carolina ===
The municipalities in North Carolina are cities, towns, and villages. There are no significant differences in legal power or status.

=== Ohio ===
In Ohio, a village is an incorporated municipality with fewer than 5,000 inhabitants, excluding residents of educational or correctional facilities. The minimum population for incorporation as a village is 1,600 inhabitants, but this was not always the case, resulting in many very small villages. If an existing village's population surpasses 5,000 at a federal census, or if a village comes to have more than 5,000 resident registered voters, it is automatically designated as a city. Cities or villages may be located within township areas; however, if a city or village becomes coterminous with a township, the township ceases to exist as a separate government (see paper township).

=== Oklahoma ===
In Oklahoma, unincorporated communities are called villages and are not counted as governments.

=== Oregon ===
In Oregon, the municipal governments are cities, towns, and villages, although there is no significance in their legal powers or status. Also, one county—Clackamas County—permits the organization of unincorporated areas into villages and hamlets. The boards of such entities are advisory to the county.

=== Texas ===
In Texas, villages may be Type B or Type C municipalities, but not Type A municipalities. The types differ in terms of population and in terms of the forms of government that they may adopt.

=== Virginia ===
In Virginia, a village is defined as a tract of land with more than 300 people where livestock are not allowed to roam free. Villages are erected by local circuit courts.

=== Vermont ===
In Vermont, villages are named communities located within the boundaries of a legally established town, unlike cities, which are outside of any town area. Villages may be incorporated or unincorporated.

=== West Virginia ===
In West Virginia, towns and villages are Class IV municipalities, i.e., having 2,000 or fewer inhabitants.

=== Wisconsin ===
In Wisconsin, cities and villages are both outside the area of any town. Cities and villages differ in terms of the population and population density required for incorporation.
