= One Judiciary Square =

Coordinates: 38°53′43.5″N 77°0′56.5″W

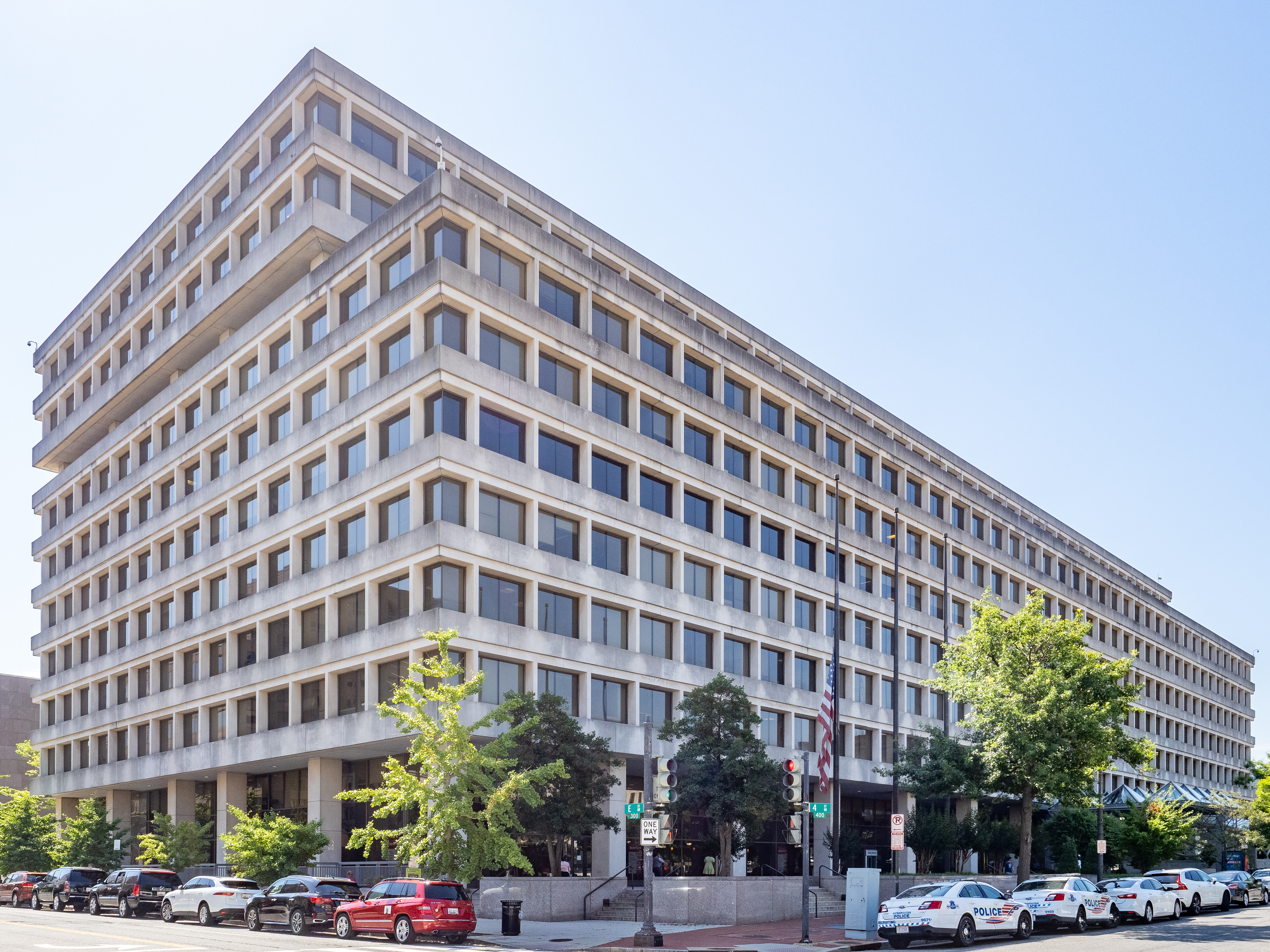
- (2024)
- Interactive map of the One Judiciary Square area

General information
- Type: Office
- Location: Washington, D.C., United States
- Completed: 1990; 36 years ago

Height
- Roof: 129.67 feet (39.52 m)

Technical details
- Floor count: 10

Design and construction
- Architects: Vlastimil Koubek & Associates

One Judiciary Square is a highrise office building at 441 Fourth Street NW in the Judiciary Square neighborhood of Washington, D.C. Designed by architect Vlastimil Koubek, the building is 129.67 feet (39.52 m) tall and has approximately 10 floors. Its construction ended in 1990.

== Background ==
Between 1992 and 1999, One Judiciary Square housed the offices of the mayor and Council of the District of Columbia while repairs were made to the historic John A. Wilson Building. One Judiciary Square now houses the offices of prominent municipal government agencies such as the District of Columbia State Board of Education, the Office of the D.C. Attorney General, and the D.C. Office of Zoning. In August 2009, it was one of the first government buildings in Washington to be fitted with a green roof. In addition, the city completed a $7.5 million renovation in September 2011 to improve the building's energy efficiency.
