= USF&G =

Defunct American insurance company

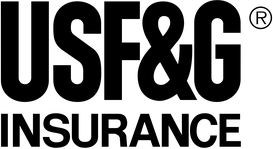
- Industry: Insurance
- Predecessor: United States Fidelity and Guaranty Company
- Founded: March 19, 1896; 130 years ago Baltimore, Maryland, United States
- Founders: John Randolph Bland
- Defunct: January 1998
- Fate: Acquired by St. Paul Travelers in 1998
- Headquarters: Baltimore, Maryland, United States
- Parent: St. Paul Travelers

USF&G was an American insurance company that existed from 1896 until 1998. It was originally called the United States Fidelity and Guaranty Company. The insurer formed a holding company for its insurance businesses and changed its name to USF&G in July 1981.

In January 1998, Saint Paul Companies acquired USF&G for $3.9 billion.

As of late 1921, the United States Fidelity and Guaranty Company building was located at 26 South Calvert Street, Baltimore, Maryland. In 1921, the company's real estate including Baltimore and New York buildings amounted to about $2.6 million. In 1970, it built the 37-story USF&G Building in Baltimore, and in the early 1970s and over the next few decades, the former Mount Saint Agnes College campus was also owned and used by USF&G.

== History ==
=== Founding and growth ===
Originally called the United States Fidelity and Guaranty Company, the Baltimore, Maryland-based company was organized on March 19, 1896, and commenced business on August 1, 1896. John Randolph Bland was the company's principal founder. On October 29, 1900, the company president John R. Bland vehemently denied that the company had paid any commissions to Richard Crocker with the intent of obtaining business in New York. Bland called it a "diabolical outrage" that the company had been brought up in a political campaign. At the time, the company's business in New York was overseen by company vice president Andrew Freedman.

In May 1902, the United States Fidelity and Guaranty Company of Maryland purchased a controlling interest in the stock of the New York surety company The Lawyer's Surety Company. The surety company remained in business, and there was no merger.

On November 20, 1902, the company agreed along with two other major Baltimore bonding surety companies, the American Bonding and Trust Company and the Fidelity and Deposit Company to "end rate cutting in taking bonds". The New York Times estimated that the agreement would implemented in other cities as well. There was a Supreme Court case concerning the company in 1908, with United States Fidelity & Guaranty Co. v. United States ex rel. Struthers Wells Co.

Official income for the year 1921 for the company was $27,593,434. Total assets were close to $34 million. After "stock market upheaval" in October 1929, on January 20, 1930, the company president R. Howard Bland reported "extraordinary heavy losses," primarily in the fidelity and surety lines and in automobile liability. The company was again involved in a Supreme Court case in early 1935, with Jennings v. United States Fidelity & Guaranty Co.. On August 14, 1935, the SEC allowed the United States Fidelity and Guaranty Company to resume trading on the Baltimore Stock Exchange, after it was earlier ordered suspended over technical matters. In 1970, it built the 37-story USF&G Building in Baltimore.

=== Name change and acquisition ===
The insurer formed a holding company for its insurance businesses and changed its name to USF&G in July 1981. It rapidly diversified its businesses, but encountered significant financial difficulties in most of them throughout the 1980s. By 1990, the company was teetering on the brink of bankruptcy. That year, Norman Blake was brought in as chief executive officer, and Blake quickly shed business units, fired most of the top management, and refocused the company on its core insurance business so that by 1992 USF&G was once more highly profitable.

Saint Paul Companies in January 1998 acquired USF&G for $3.9 billion in stock and assumed debt. Saint Paul Companies had been founded as Saint Paul Fire and Marine Insurance Co. in 1853 in Minnesota before spreading nationally. The company began operating as a subsidiary of St. Paul Fire and Marine Insurance Company Inc.

== Facilities and buildings ==
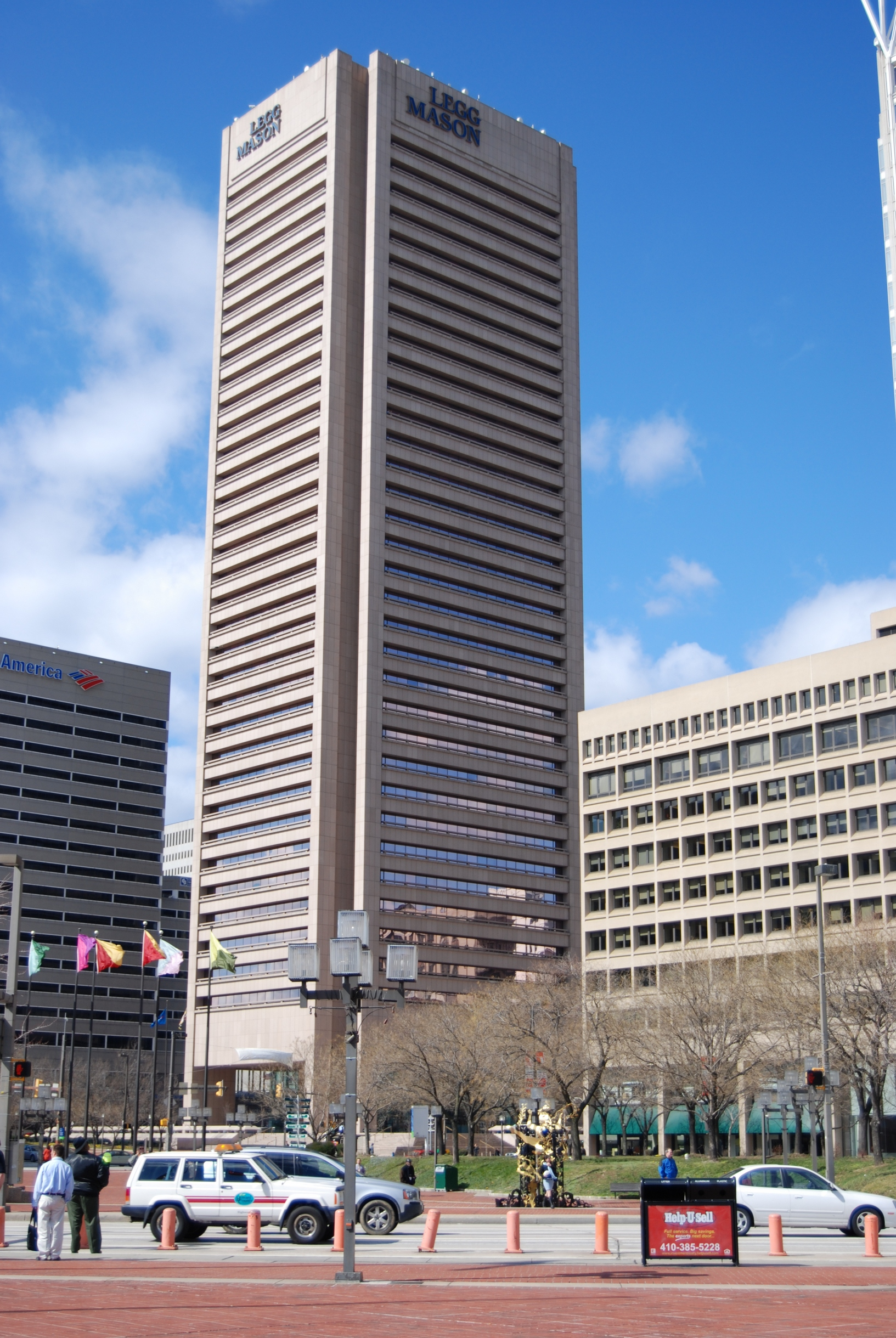
The company built the pink granite-clad USF&G Building in Baltimore's Inner Harbor area in 1973.

As of late 1921, the United States Fidelity and Guaranty Company building was located at 26 South Calvert Street, Baltimore, Maryland. On December 31, 1921, the company's real estate including Baltimore and New York buildings amounted to $2,540,403.77.

In 1970, USF&G built the 37-story, pink granite-clad USF&G Building in Baltimore's Inner Harbor area. The building helped spark economic redevelopment in the area and became a Baltimore landmark. As of 2011, the USF&G Building had been renamed the Transamerica Tower and remained the tallest building in Maryland. Starting in the early 1970s and over the next few decades, the former Mount Saint Agnes College campus was owned and used by United States Fidelity & Guaranty Company and the St. Paul Companies. In 2003 the campus was purchased by Johns Hopkins University.

== Executives ==
John J. Kennedy was a New York State Treasurer from 1911 to 1914, who committed suicide in 1914. Previously, Kennedy had been the resident vice president at Buffalo of the United States Fidelity and Guaranty Company of Baltimore, a bonding company connected with Tammany, but upon his election in 1910 had turned over his business to his son William who became Resident Secretary at Buffalo of the company. William Kennedy was linked in the bonding business with Charles F. Murphy, Jr., the nephew of Tammany Hall boss Charles F. Murphy. Both Kennedys, Murphy and others had been investigated by Governor Martin H. Glynn's Special Graft Investigator James W. Osborne and questioned by the Manhattan Grand Jury and District Attorney Charles S. Whitman. According to unnamed sources Treasurer Kennedy feared to be indicted for perjury which was denied by his attorney.

== Sport sponsorships ==
The insurer sponsored the PGA Tour golf tournament known as the New Orleans Open beginning in 1981. In its first year, it was the USF&G New Orleans Open, then became the USF&G Classic in 1982. That sponsorship ended after 1991, and is now the Zurich Classic of New Orleans, a team event. From 1987 to 1995, the company sponsored the Sugar Bowl, a post-season college football bowl game held in New Orleans.

The company also sponsored the Formula One team Arrows Grand Prix International from 1986 to 1990. In 1988 and 1989, USF&G sponsored the United States Club Lacrosse Association Championship Game that was shown on TV.

== See also ==
- Business in Maryland
- Economy of Maryland
