= Friendship Heights Village, Maryland =

Friendship Heights Village
- Census-designated place
- Flag

- Coordinates: 38°57′48″N 77°05′23″W
- Country: United States
- State: Maryland
- County: Montgomery

Area
  - Total: 0.058 sq mi (0.15 km^{2})
  - Land: 0.058 sq mi (0.15 km^{2})
  - Water: 0 sq mi (0.00 km^{2})
- Elevation: 308 ft (94 m)

Population (2020)
  - Total: 5,360
  - Density: 90,780.5/sq mi (35,050.55/km^{2})
- Time zone: UTC−5 (Eastern (EST))
  - Summer (DST): UTC−4 (EDT)
- ZIP code: 20815
- Area codes: 240 and 301
- FIPS code: 24-30837
- GNIS feature ID: 2389820

Friendship Heights Village is an urbanized, unincorporated area in Montgomery County, Maryland, United States. It is distinct from the Washington, D.C., neighborhood of Friendship Heights. Friendship Heights Village is a census-designated place (CDP), with a population of 5,360 at the 2020 census.

== Geography ==
According to the United States Census Bureau, the CDP has a total area of 0.05503 square miles (0.1425 km^{2}), all land.

== Demographics ==
Historical population
Census	Pop.	Note	%±
2010	4,698		—
2020	5,360		14.1%
source: 2010–2020

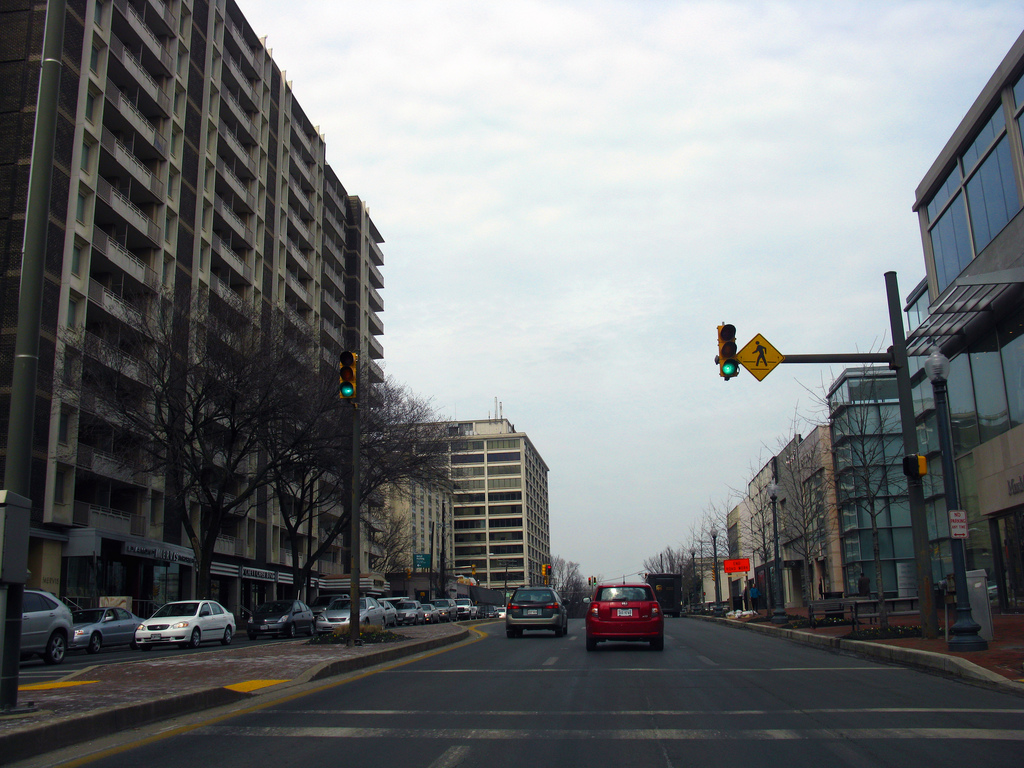
Northbound on Wisconsin Ave in Friendship Heights Village

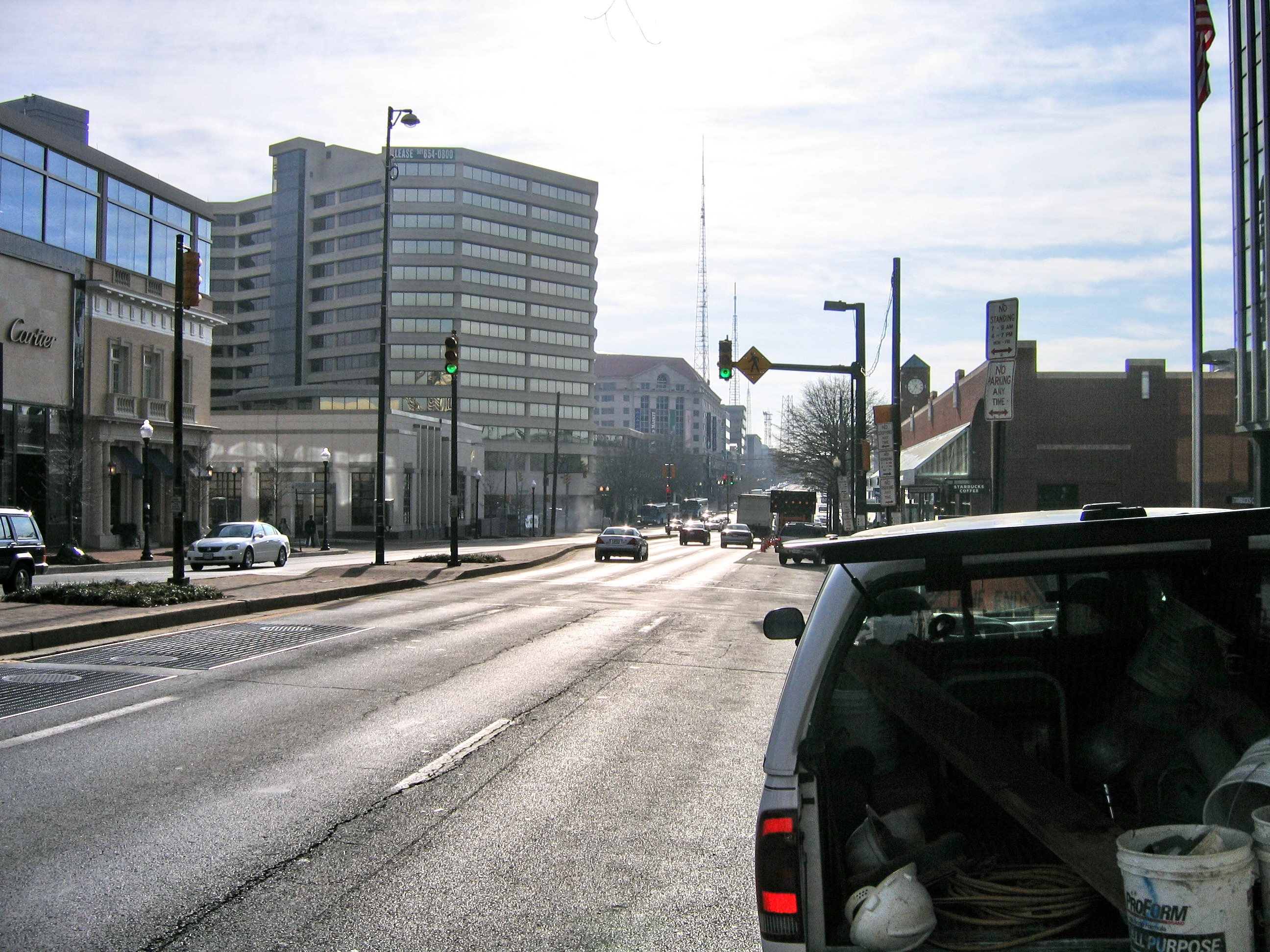
Wisconsin Avenue in Friendship Heights Village

=== 2020 census ===
As of the 2020 census, Friendship Heights Village had a population of 5,360. The median age was 49.3 years. 9.8% of residents were under the age of 18 and 32.4% of residents were 65 years of age or older. For every 100 females there were 70.3 males, and for every 100 females age 18 and over there were 68.5 males age 18 and over.

There were 3,265 households in Friendship Heights Village, of which 11.3% had children under the age of 18 living in them. Of all households, 26.5% were married-couple households, 21.2% were households with a male householder and no spouse or partner present, and 47.6% were households with a female householder and no spouse or partner present. About 57.3% of all households were made up of individuals and 26.8% had someone living alone who was 65 years of age or older.

There were 3,562 housing units, of which 8.3% were vacant. The homeowner vacancy rate was 1.5% and the rental vacancy rate was 7.1%. 100.0% of residents lived in urban areas, while 0.0% lived in rural areas.

The population density was 90,848 per square mile, the highest population density of any incorporated place or census-designated place in the United States.

Racial composition as of the 2020 census
Race	Number	Percent
White	3,521	65.7%
Black or African American	368	6.9%
American Indian and Alaska Native	9	0.2%
Asian	693	12.9%
Native Hawaiian and Other Pacific Islander	0	0.0%
Some other race	147	2.7%
Two or more races	622	11.6%
Hispanic or Latino (of any race)	595	11.1%

=== Demographic estimates ===
28% of residents were foreign born, while 98% were high school graduates or higher and 88% held a bachelor's degree or higher.

=== Income and poverty ===
The median income for a household in the area was $106,771, and the per capita income was $91,197.

== Village of Friendship Heights ==
Although not an incorporated municipality, the Village of Friendship Heights was established as a Special Tax District in 1914. Its boundaries—Wisconsin Avenue, Willard Avenue, and Somerset Terrace (with Little Falls Branch)—enclose 34 acres (140,000 m^{2}) and is almost entirely occupied by high-rise residential buildings. It has the highest population density of any census-designated place or city in the United States. In fact, its density exceeds that of the New York City borough of Manhattan, which itself is coextensive with the United States' most dense county. The 2010 population of Friendship Village Heights was 4,698, giving it a population density of 88,432 per square mile, versus Manhattan's approximate 70,000.

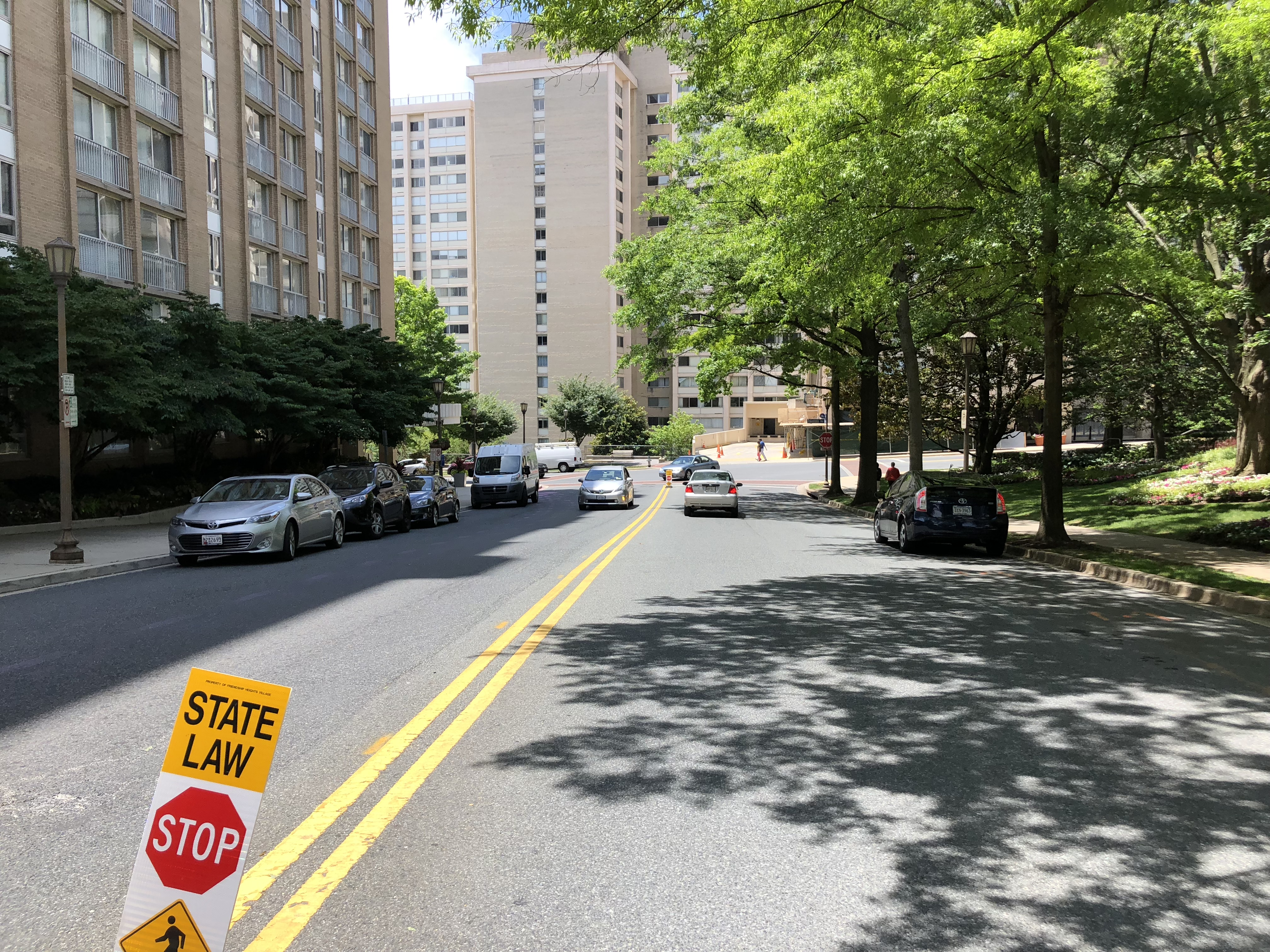
South Park Avenue in Friendship Heights

Buildings:

1. Highland House Apartments - 5480 Wisconsin Avenue
2. Highland House West Apartments - 4450 S. Park Avenue
3. The Willoughby Condominium - 4515 Willard Avenue
4. The Carleton Condominium - 4550 N. Park Avenue
5. Office Building - 5550 Friendship Blvd.
6. The Elizabeth Condominium - 4601 N. Park Avenue
7. 4615 North Park Apartments
8. Police Field Office - 4602 N. Park Avenue
9. 4620 N. Park Avenue Condominium
10. Willard Towers - 4701 Willard Avenue
11. Sunrise Brighton Gardens (Assisted Living Residence) - 5555 Friendship Blvd.
12. Friendship Heights Village Center - 4433 S. Park Avenue
13. Chevy Chase Office Building - 5530 Wisconsin Avenue
14. Courtyard by Marriott Chevy Chase - 5520 Wisconsin Avenue
15. Barlow Office Building - 5454 Wisconsin Avenue
16. Chase Tower Office and Retail Building - 4445 Willard Avenue

The Village is governed by a seven-member village council, which includes the mayor; each member is elected to a two-year term.

The Village provides numerous services for its citizens, such as the following:

1. Shuttle bus which circles the neighborhood, making stops at the major residential buildings, the Friendship Heights Village Center, nearby shopping centers, and the Friendship Heights stop of the Washington Metro.
2. MVA on Wheels
3. Visiting Nurse
4. Permit Applications
5. Police Field Office
6. Mobile Commuter Store
7. Shredding Truck
8. Farmers' Market

The Village also offer a wide variety of activities and events at its Village Center, such as classes, trainings, concerts, and programs on demand, just to name a few. Every year, the Village also hosts three large events for its residents: April 13 - Community Day to celebrate the Village's founding; July 4 - Independence Day Celebration; and mid-October - Fall festival.

== See also ==
- List of United States cities by population density
