= 1959 Baltimore mayoral election =

Baltimore mayoral election, 1959
- May 5, 1959
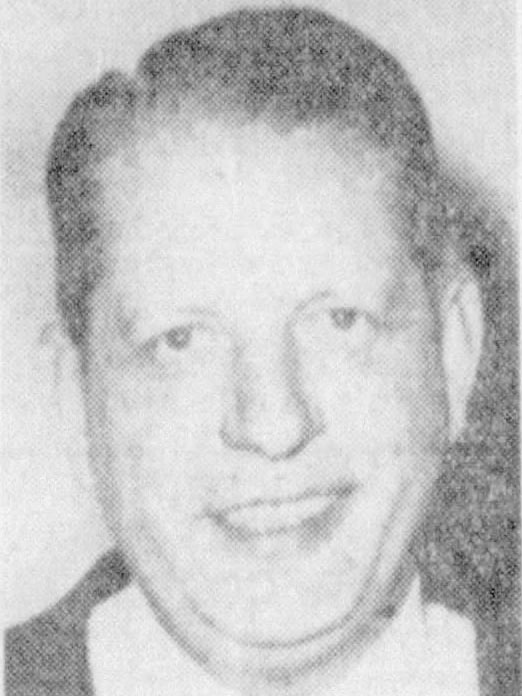

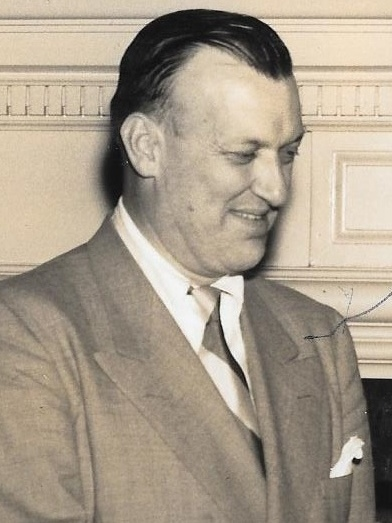
| Candidate | J. Harold Grady | Theodore McKeldin |
| Party | Democratic | Republican |
| Popular vote | 155,001 | 72,745 |
| Percentage | 68.06% | 31.94% |
Mayor before election
Thomas D'Alesandro Jr.
Democratic
Elected mayor
J. Harold Grady
Democratic

The 1959 Baltimore mayoral election saw the election of J. Harold Grady. Grady unseated incumbent mayor Thomas D'Alesandro Jr. in the Democratic primary, and went on to defeat former mayor and governor Theodore McKeldin in the general election.

== Nominations ==
Primary elections were held March 3.

=== Democratic primary ===
Incumbent mayor Thomas D'Alesandro was defeated in the primary.

Democratic primary results
| Party | Candidate | Votes | % |
|---|---|---|---|
| Democratic | J. Harold Grady | 103,358 | 57.35% |
| Democratic | Thomas D'Alesandro Jr. (incumbent) | 70,341 | 39.03% |
| Democratic | Morgan L. Amaimo | 3,626 | 2.01% |
| Democratic | Edgar N. Gayhardt | 1,606 | 0.89% |
| Democratic | Francis X. McSweeney | 1,285 | 0.71% |
| Total votes | | 180,216 | |

=== Republican primary ===
Republican primary results
| Party | Candidate | Votes | % |
|---|---|---|---|
| Republican | Theodore McKeldin | 6,266 | 74.54% |
| Republican | Dorothy B. Davis | 3,336 | 15.29% |
| Republican | Louis R. Milio | 2,220 | 10.17% |
| Total votes | | 21,822 | |

== General election ==
The general election was held May 5.

Baltimore mayoral general election, 1959
| Party | Candidate | Votes | % |
|---|---|---|---|
| Democratic | J. Harold Grady | 155,001 | 68.06% |
| Republican | Theodore McKeldin | 72,745 | 31.94% |
| Total votes | | 227,746 | |
