= Thomas D'Alesandro Jr. =

American politician (1903–1987)

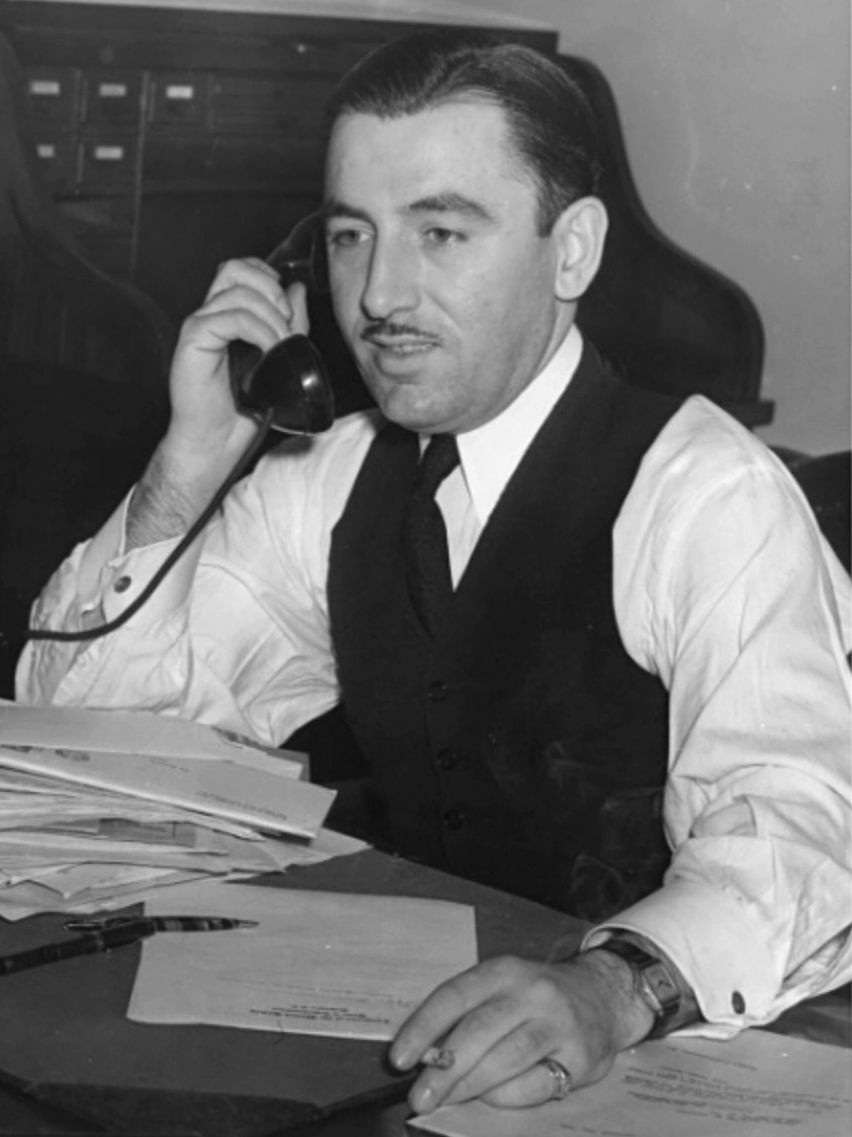
- D'Alesandro in 1939

41st Mayor of Baltimore
- In office May 16, 1947 – May 16, 1959
- Preceded by: Theodore McKeldin
- Succeeded by: J. Harold Grady

Member of the U.S. House of Representatives from Maryland's 3rd district
- In office January 3, 1939 – May 16, 1947
- Preceded by: Vincent Palmisano
- Succeeded by: Edward Garmatz

Member of the Maryland House of Delegates from the Baltimore City's 1st district
- In office 1926–1933

Personal details
- Born: Thomas Ludwig John D'Alesandro Jr. August 1, 1903 Baltimore, Maryland, U.S.
- Died: August 23, 1987 (aged 84) Baltimore, Maryland, U.S.
- Party: Democratic
- Spouse: Annunciata Lombardi
- Children: 6, including Thomas III and Nancy Pelosi

Thomas Ludwig John D'Alesandro Jr. (August 1, 1903 – August 23, 1987) was an American politician who served as the 41st mayor of Baltimore from 1947 to 1959. A member of the Democratic Party, he previously represented Maryland's 3rd congressional district in the United States House of Representatives from 1939 until 1947. He was known for his own political prominence as well as that of his children and was the patriarch of the D'Alesandro political family, which includes Nancy Pelosi, the 52nd speaker of the United States House of Representatives; and Thomas D'Alesandro III, the 44th mayor of Baltimore.

== Early life ==
D'Alesandro was born in Baltimore on August 1, 1903. He was the son of Maria Antonia Petronilla (née Foppiani) and Tommaso F. D'Alessandro. His father was born in Montenerodomo, Abruzzo, Italy, and his mother was born in Baltimore, to parents from Genoa, Liguria, Italy. D'Alesandro attended Calvert Business College in Baltimore. Before beginning his political career, he worked as an insurance and real estate broker.

== Career ==
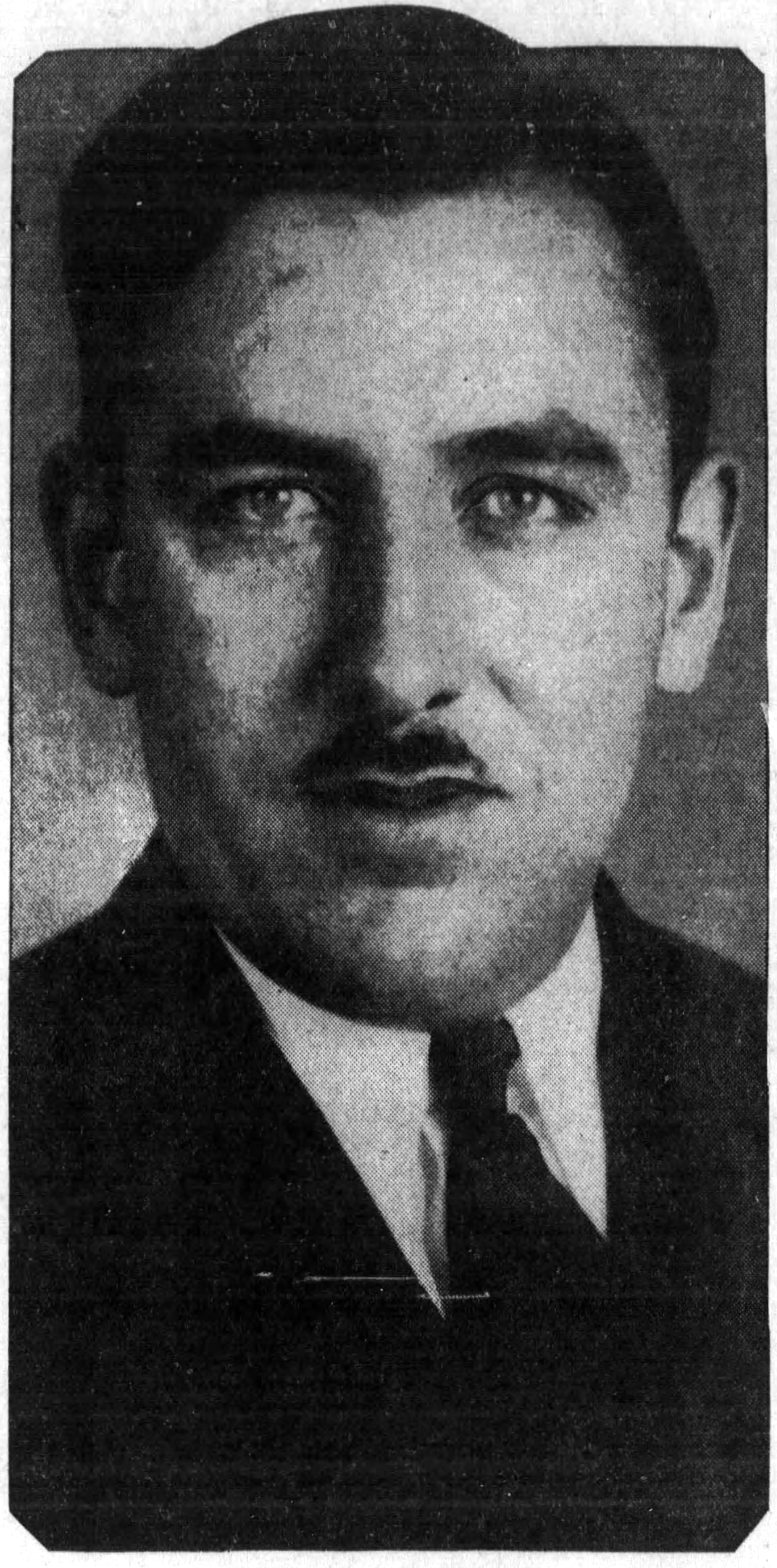
D'Alesandro c. 1932

D'Alesandro served as a member of the Maryland State House of Delegates from 1926 to 1933. After serving in Annapolis, D'Alesandro was then appointed as General Deputy Collector of Internal Revenue, a post in which he served during 1933–1934. He then was elected to serve on the Baltimore City Council from 1935 to 1938.

D'Alesandro was then elected to the 76th Congress and to the four succeeding Congresses, serving from January 3, 1939, until he resigned on May 16, 1947. While in Congress, D'Alesandro strongly supported the Bergson Group, a "political action committee set up to challenge the Roosevelt Administration's policies on the Jewish refugee issue during the Holocaust, and later lobbied against British control of Palestine" despite his equally strong support for Roosevelt's other policies.

Following his service in Congress he was the Mayor of Baltimore for 12 years from May 1947 to May 1959. D'Alesandro served on the Federal Renegotiation Board from 1961 to 1969 after being appointed by President John F. Kennedy. On September 21, 1966, President Lyndon Baines Johnson's assistant Mildred Stegall requested a routine FBI name check on D'Alesandro. FBI records released on January 6, 2021 showed D'Alesandro had been the subject of a Special Inquiry investigation in March and April 1961, revealing numerous allegations of association with criminals in Baltimore.

=== Political campaigns ===
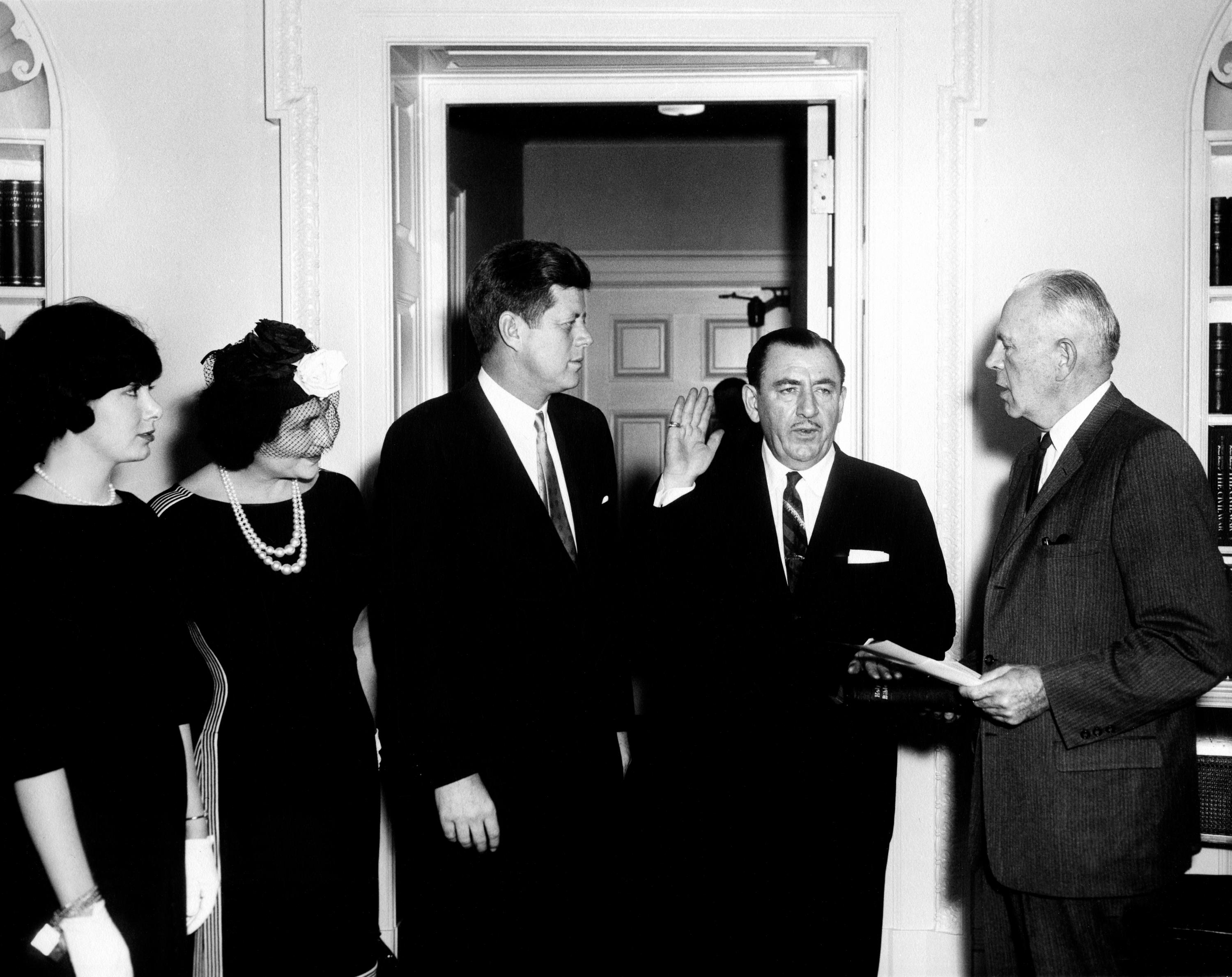
D'Alesandro being sworn in as a member of the Renegotiation Board in 1961

D'Alesandro was a strong contender for Governor of Maryland in 1954, but dropped out after being implicated in receiving undeclared money from Dominic Piracci, a parking garage owner convicted of fraud, conspiracy, and conspiracy to obstruct justice. Piracci was the father of Margie Piracci D'Alesandro, the wife of D'Alesandro's oldest son and namesake Thomas D'Alesandro III. Mayor D'Alesandro was later exonerated and never indicted.

After withdrawing, D'Alesandro tacitly supported University of Maryland President Curley Byrd, who lost, 54.5% to 45.5%, to Theodore McKeldin, the Republican incumbent and D'Alesandro's predecessor as Mayor of Baltimore.

In 1958, D'Alesandro ran for the United States Senate in a bid to defeat Republican incumbent J. Glenn Beall. D'Alesandro first had to spend money and time defeating perennial candidate/contractor George P. Mahoney in the Democratic primary. D'Alesandro then ran a strong campaign, losing to Beall in a close race, the first election D'Alesandro had ever lost.

In 1959, D'Alesandro was defeated in a bid for another term for Mayor of Baltimore by J. Harold Grady.

=== Retrospective analysis ===
In 2017, in an effort to counter D'Alesandro's daughter Nancy's efforts to remove statues of Confederate figures from the halls of Congress, conservative commentators noted that in 1948, D'Alesandro dedicated the Stonewall Jackson and Robert E. Lee Monument in his capacity as Mayor of Baltimore, along with the then-Governor of Maryland, William Preston Lane Jr. His son, Thomas D'Alesandro III, who later served as Mayor of Baltimore from 1967 to 1971, said about his father "His whole life was politics. He was not what you would call a flaming liberal, but he was a progressive."

== Personal life ==
D'Alesandro was married to Annunciata M. ("Nancy") Lombardi (1909–1995). Together, the couple had six children, five sons and a daughter:

- Thomas Ludwig John D'Alesandro III (1929–2019), attorney and politician who served as the mayor of Baltimore from 1967 to 1971.
- Nicholas M. D'Alesandro (1930–1934)
- Franklin Delano Roosevelt D'Alesandro (1933–2007), who also served in the U.S. Army.
- Hector Joseph D'Alesandro (1935–1995)
- Joseph Thomas D'Alesandro (1937–2004)
- Nancy Patricia D'Alesandro Pelosi (born 1940), politician who served as the speaker of the House from 2007 to 2011 and from 2019 to 2023; she is the first woman elected Speaker and the first woman in American history to lead a major political party in either chamber of Congress.

D'Alesandro did not speak Italian but spoke Yiddish.

Two months after being present at Nancy's swearing in as a congresswoman, D'Alesandro died on August 23, 1987, in Baltimore, Maryland.

In March 2026, Annunciata Lombardi D'Alesandro was inducted into the Maryland Women's Hall of Fame.

== See also ==
- 1947 Baltimore mayoral election
- 1951 Baltimore mayoral election
- 1955 Baltimore mayoral election
- Thomas D'Alesandro Stadium

U.S. House of Representatives
Preceded by Vincent Palmisano	Member of the U.S. House of Representatives from Maryland's 3rd congressional district 1939–1947	Succeeded by Edward Garmatz
Political offices
Preceded by Theodore McKeldin	Mayor of Baltimore; 1947–1959	Succeeded by J. Harold Grady
Party political offices
Preceded by George P. Mahoney	Democratic nominee for U.S. Senator from Maryland (Class 1); 1958	Succeeded by Joseph Tydings
