= LaVonda =

LaVonda is a given name. People with the name include:

- LaVonda Reed (born 1969), American academic administrator and lawyer
- LaVonda Wagner (born 1964), American basketball player and coach
