= Peter Angelos =

American trial lawyer (1929–2024)

Member of the Baltimore City Council from the 3rd District
- In office 1959–1963
- Succeeded by: J. Joseph Curran Sr.

Personal details
- Born: George Angelos; July 4, 1929 Pittsburgh, Pennsylvania, U.S.
- Died: March 23, 2024 (aged 94) Towson, Maryland, U.S.
- Party: Democratic
- Spouse: Georgia Kousouris (m. 1966)
- Children: 2, including John P. Angelos
- Education: University of Baltimore (BA, LLB)
- Occupation: Lawyer, Owner: MLB, Baltimore Orioles, Racehorse owner/breeder
- Awards: Ellis Island Medal of Honor (1996)

Peter George Angelos (born George Angelos; July 4, 1929 – March 23, 2024) was an American trial lawyer and baseball executive from Baltimore, Maryland. Angelos was the majority owner of the Baltimore Orioles, a team in the American League of Major League Baseball, from 1993 until his death in 2024.

== Early life and education ==
George Angelos was born in Pittsburgh on July 4, 1929, the son of John and Frances Angelos, who immigrated to the United States from Menetes, Karpathos, Greece. His first name was changed to Peter shortly after his birth. Angelos' family settled in the working-class neighborhood of Highlandtown, Baltimore, and lived in a row house. Angelos' father, who spoke mostly Greek at home, owned a local tavern.

After graduating from Patterson Park High School, Angelos attended the University of Baltimore, where he earned a bachelor's degree. He then attended law school at the University of Baltimore School of Law, taking night classes while he worked in his family's tavern. He graduated from law school in 1960 and was named class valedictorian.

== Career ==
=== Law practice ===
Angelos passed the bar in 1961 and opened an office specializing in handling product-liability cases for employees, almost always on a contingency basis. In one of his cases, he represented some 8,700 steelworkers, shipyard workers, and manufacturers' employees in a consolidated-action asbestos poisoning suit that was partially settled in 1992. Angelos' take from that litigation alone has been estimated at $330 million. He served a brief stint on the Baltimore City Council from 1959 to 1963 and ran for mayor on the city's first interracial ticket in 1967, but lost to Thomas D'Alesandro III. In the mid-1980s, Angelos was investigated by the Federal Bureau of Investigation into whether Angelos was running a sham medical service company and fraudulently billing insurers. The investigation went as far as executing a search warrant at one of his offices and federal prosecutors obtaining grand jury subpoenas, but Angelos was not charged with any related crimes.

In March 1996, Maryland hired Angelos to represent the state in its suit against tobacco companies with a 25% contingency fee. After Angelos filed suit on behalf of the state the trial court ruled that the state's recovery would be limited to subrogation of losses through programs such as Medicaid; this would have effectively ended the state's case. Angelos successfully lobbied the state legislature to change the law to allow the state's suit to proceed. The Maryland state legislature also cut Angelos' fee to 12.5%. Eventually he settled for $150 million paid over five years.

Angelos also represented the state of Maryland in a suit against Philip Morris and suing Wyeth, the makers of part of the diet pill combination fen-phen. As of 2019, Angelos' law firm had offices in Baltimore, Towson, and Cumberland, Maryland; Philadelphia, Bethlehem, and Harrisburg, Pennsylvania; and Knoxville, Tennessee. The firm is headquartered in the historic One Charles Center building in downtown Baltimore which was purchased by Angelos for $6 million in 1996.

=== Politics ===
A lifelong Democrat, Angelos began his political career with an unsuccessful run for Maryland Senate in 1958. He went on to hold a seat on the Baltimore City Council from 1959 to 1963. He was the first Greek-American to be elected to the council. Though Angelos became known for demanding governmental oversight and fiscal responsibility, few of his calls for investigations into city agencies and spending led to lasting change. In 1963, he ran unsuccessfully for city council president, but lost to Thomas D'Alesandro III, who was both the son of a popular former Mayor of Baltimore and would later be Mayor of Baltimore himself.

Angelos ran for the Democratic nomination in the 1967 Baltimore mayoral election, on the city's first racially integrated ticket, with Clarence Mitchell III was running for City Council President, but he lost the nomination to D'Alesandro, who received nearly 75% of the vote and went on to beat Republican Arthur W. Sherwood in the general election.

In the late 1990s, Angelos was investigated by the FBI on allegations that he had bribed a Maryland state senator. Angelos was not charged with any related crimes.

Angelos donated $272,000 to the independent expenditure-only committee (Super PAC) Draft Biden which sought to induce Vice President Joe Biden to enter the 2016 Democratic Primary for President.

=== Baltimore Orioles ===
==== Acquiring the team ====
In 1993, Angelos assembled a group of investors to purchase the Baltimore Orioles of Major League Baseball (MLB) from New York venture capitalist Eli Jacobs. While Angelos was the principal investor, contributing $40 million, his fellow Oriole group owners included novelist Tom Clancy, filmmaker Barry Levinson, and tennis player Pam Shriver. On October 4, 1993, Jacobs sold the Orioles to Angelos' group for $173 million, the highest price paid for a sports franchise at that time. Angelos took over as managing partner and principal owner of the team.

Angelos became a hands-on owner willing to pay high salaries to talented free agents. Under Angelos' direction, the Orioles signed four high-priced free agents in 1994: Rafael Palmeiro, Sid Fernandez, Chris Sabo, and Lee Smith. As one of the newest baseball owners, Angelos was expected to abide by the owners' decisions quietly without offering any alternatives or using his experience with labor law to negotiate with the players' union. Angelos did not like that arrangement and he did not particularly care if the world found out.

During the 1994–95 MLB strike, when the other owners signed a document canceling the rest of the 1994 MLB season, including the 1994 World Series, Angelos refused to sign it because it blamed the players for the impasse. When the owners formed a committee to negotiate the lockout, they did not include Angelos, despite his experience as a labor-management negotiator. When talks between the players and the owners stalled in December 1994 and the owners voted to impose a salary cap, Angelos was one of three dissenters to the arrangement. He also refused to field replacement players should the strike last into the 1995 MLB season.

Angelos announced his decision about replacement players early in 1995 and was hailed as a champion of the worker. As his fellow owners mulled what action to take against Angelos — everything from a $250,000 fine for each game missed to forcing the sale of the Orioles — the lockout was finally settled in time for regular season play with major leaguers.

==== Attempt to acquire Tampa Bay Buccaneers ====
On August 25, 1994, Tampa Bay Buccaneers owner Hugh Culverhouse died. Initially the trust Culverhouse previously established insisted the team was not for sale; however, another poor season meant this decision was reversed two months later at the heart of the season, after widow Joy Culverhouse filed $25 million claim against the estate. Angelos offered $200 million for the team, which would have been the highest price paid at the time for a professional sports franchise, with a ready-made plan to move the Buccaneers to Baltimore, which had not had an NFL team since the Colts were relocated to Indianapolis before the 1984 season. In the latter part of December it was thought that Angelos was likely to buy the Bucs, but the fact that the team management was negotiating with Tampa as it sought an owner created problems because Angelos did not want to buy a team he could not relocate to Baltimore.

By early January 1995, Angelos was preparing his bid for the Buccaneers, which was between $15 million and $25 million greater than that of a Florida citrus company. The local citrus group's bid was rejected on January 10, but the possibility of Washington Redskins owner Jack Kent Cooke building a stadium for his own team near Baltimore meant there was always the danger Angelos' prerequisite relocation would not be approved. When Yankees owner George Steinbrenner made a bid for the Bucs in the second week of January 1995, Angelos said he had become willing to divest himself of the Orioles to acquire the Tampa Bay franchise. Ultimately, a second Florida bid in mid-January by Palm Beach millionaire Malcolm Glazer – who ironically had wanted to bring Baltimore an NFL expansion franchise as recently as one year previously – would buy the Bucs on January 17 and keep the team in Tampa Bay.

==== Later years as owner ====
Angelos arranged for a two-game exhibition series to be played between the Orioles and the Cuban national baseball team in 1999. The Orioles won the first game, played in Havana, while the Cuban team won the second game, held at Oriole Park at Camden Yards. In 2000, the team's general manager, Syd Thrift, told The Washington Times that the team had a practice of not signing players who had defected from Cuba, which he attributed to Angelos' desire to avoid doing "anything that could be interpreted as being disrespectful" by the Cuban government. Angelos denied the existence of such a policy. Subsequent investigations by MLB and the United States Department of Justice did not find evidence that the absence of Cuban players on the Orioles' roster or in its minor league system was due to discrimination.

After becoming owner of the Orioles, Angelos became a controversial figure. In the early years of his ownership, Angelos was repeatedly criticized by The Baltimore Sun for the team's performance, but was praised by his associates for his work ethic and dedication. His stance during the 1994 baseball strike was extremely popular with fans. Critics accused Angelos of rapidly hiring and firing baseball managers, and reportedly overruling their decisions. However, Angelos' decision to hire Andy MacPhail as the team's general manager and president of baseball operations in 2007 was met with general approval.

In May 2009, a Sports Illustrated article reviewing MLB owners rated Angelos as the worst owner in the major leagues. The article notes that the methodology "was not scientific" and "weighing heavily in the decision was the team's success or failure on the field." Two weeks later, Brady Anderson, a member of the Baltimore Orioles Hall of Fame, responded in an op-ed to The Baltimore Sun, writing that Angelos deserves to be on a list of the "best owners in baseball."

As Angelos' health began to fail, his sons Louis and John took on more leadership roles in the Orioles as he focused more on his health. In February 2019, MLB instructed the Orioles that they had until June to inform the league on who was controlling the team. In November 2020, the league approved John P. Angelos, vice president of the Orioles and Peter's son, as the team's new control person. In October 2019, John Angelos stated that neither he nor his father Peter had any plans to relocate the Orioles outside Baltimore, contrary to rumors.

On January 30, 2024, Angelos agreed to sell the team to a group led by David Rubenstein that includes New York investor Michael Arougheti and Cal Ripken Jr. for $1.725 billion. If approved by the league's owners, the group would acquire 40% of the team and the remainder after Angelos' death. Angelos died on March 23, 2024, three days before the sale of the team had been expected to be finalized.

=== Horse racing ===
Angelos bred and raced Thoroughbred horses and in 1998 purchased the 237-acre (0.96 km^{2}) Ross Valley Farm in Baltimore County. He named one of his horses Showalter in honor of Orioles manager Buck Showalter. As a 2-year-old gelding, Showalter won his maiden race at Laurel Park in 2015.

== Charity ==
Angelos was known for various acts of charity and philanthropy, having contributed millions to civic and community institutions around Maryland. He donated millions of dollars to the Democratic Party and its candidates, and was a major supporter of the Greek Orthodox Cathedral of the Annunciation in Baltimore. He was the largest individual donor to the University of Baltimore and pledged $5 million to the school in 2008. In 2010, The Baltimore Sun reported that Angelos had recently donated $10 million to the university. The same report notes that during the particularly hot summer of 2010, Angelos anonymously donated $300,000 to keep Baltimore city pools open. In 2013, Angelos donated $15 million toward the construction of the John and Frances Angelos Law Center.

=== Awards ===
Angelos was named "Marylander of the Year" by The Baltimore Sun in 1998, with a citation that read: "Measured by professional accomplishments and contributions to his city and region, he is the Marylander of this decade." In 1995, Angelos received the Golden Plate Award of the American Academy of Achievement presented by Awards Council member Tom Clancy and was Host of the 1997 Achievement Summit in Baltimore. Angelos was awarded the Ellis Island Medal of Honor in 1996. In 2016, Angelos was inducted into The Baltimore Sun's Business and Civic Hall of Fame for his lifetime of philanthropy.

== Personal life ==
Angelos married Georgia Kousouris in 1966, and they had two children together, John and Louis. John had served as an executive vice president of the Baltimore Orioles since 1999.

Angelos died at the Greater Baltimore Medical Center on March 23, 2024, at age 94.
