= 1947 Baltimore mayoral election =

- May 6, 1947
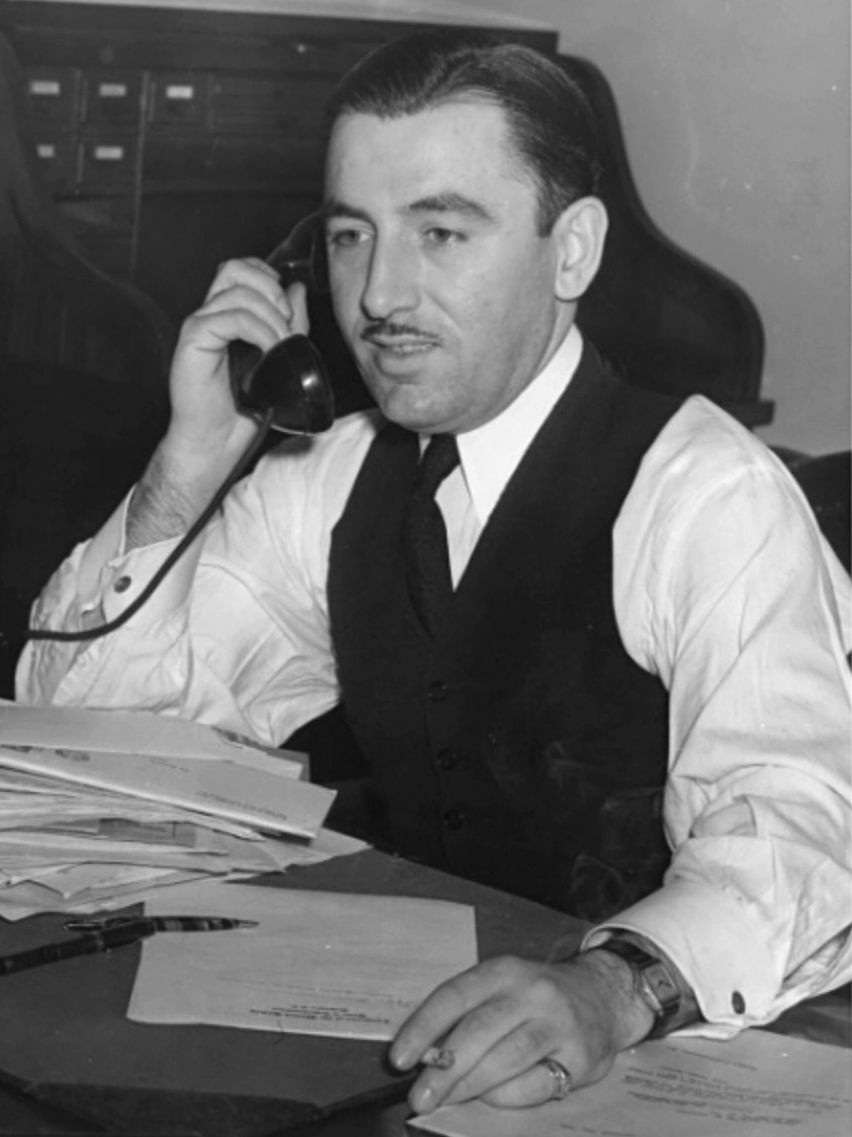

Candidate	Thomas D'Alesandro Jr.	Deeley K. Nice
Party	Democratic	Republican
Popular vote	96,161	71,889
Percentage	57.22%	42.78%
Mayor before election
Theodore McKeldin
Republican
Elected mayor
Thomas D'Alesandro Jr.
Democratic

The 1947 Baltimore mayoral election saw the election of Thomas D'Alesandro Jr.

== General election ==
The general election was held on May 6, 1947.

Baltimore mayoral general election, 1947
Party	Candidate	Votes	%
Democratic	Thomas D'Alesandro Jr.	96,161	57.22%
Republican	Deeley K. Nice	71,889	42.78%
Total votes		168,050	
