= 1963 Baltimore mayoral election =

- May 7, 1963
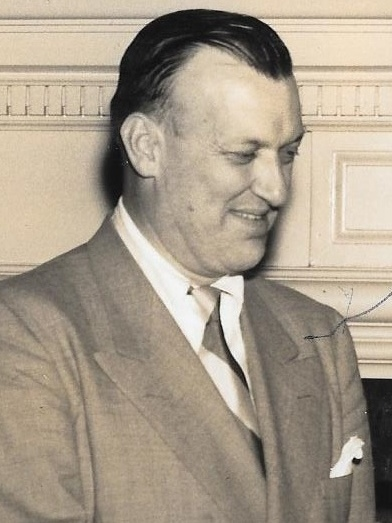

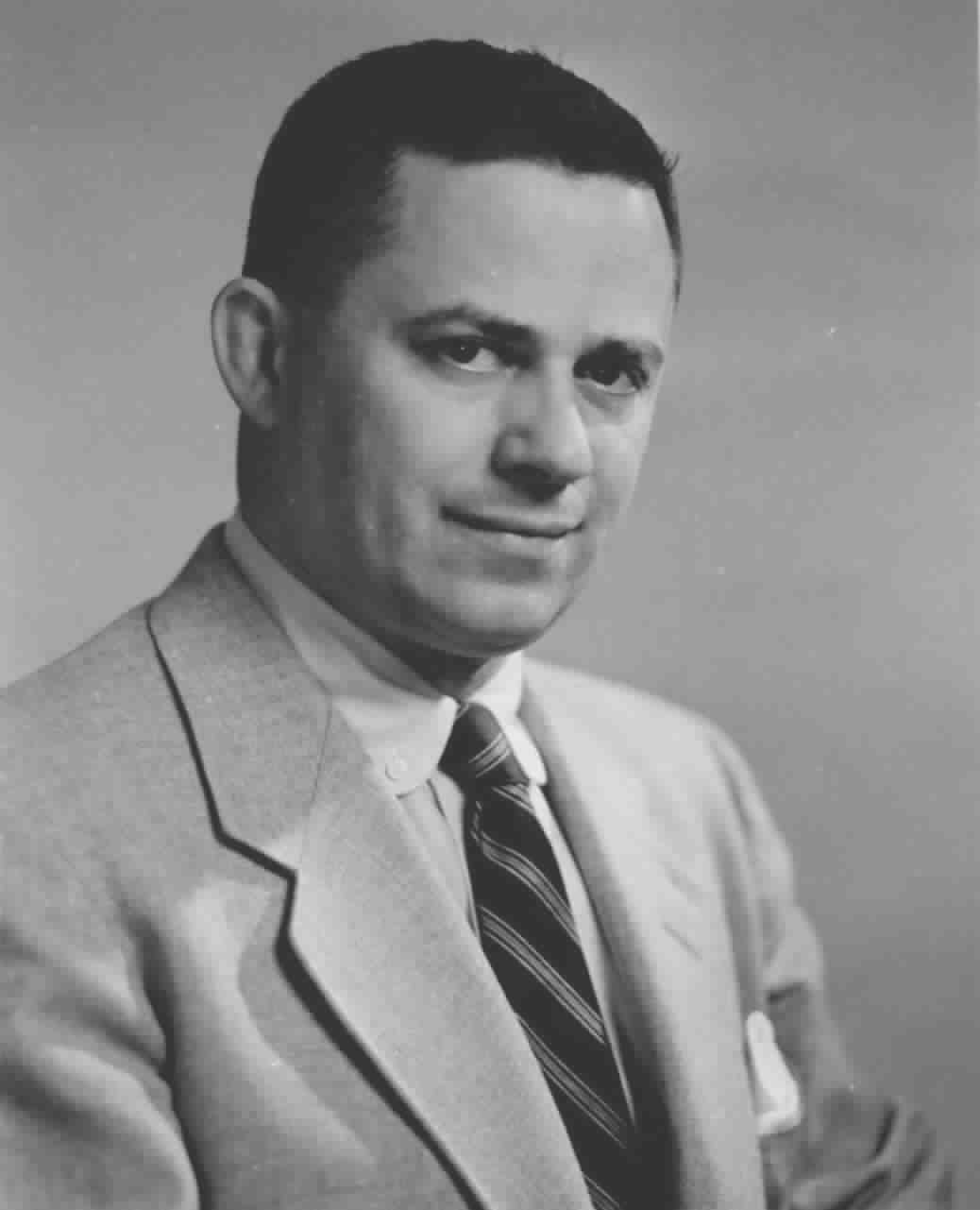
Candidate	Theodore McKeldin	Philip H. Goodman
Party	Republican	Democratic
Popular vote	108,427	103,761
Percentage	51.10%	48.90%
Mayor before election
Philip H. Goodman
Democratic
Elected mayor
Theodore McKeldin
Republican

The 1963 Baltimore mayoral election saw the former mayor and governor Theodore McKeldin return to office for a second non-consecutive term as mayor by defeating incumbent mayor Philip H. Goodman.

To date, this is the last time a Republican won a mayoral election in Baltimore. It is also the last time a Republican managed even 30% of the city's vote.

== Nominations ==
Primary elections were held March 5.

=== Democratic primary ===
Among those challenging for the Democratic nomination Goodman were Comptroller R. Walter Graham, Jr. and City Council President Leon Abramson.

Democratic primary results
Party	Candidate	Votes	%
Democratic	Philip H. Goodman (incumbent)	70,961	49.48%
Democratic	C. Meredith Boyce	38,705	26.99%
Democratic	R. Walter Graham, Jr.	20,364	14.20%
Democratic	Leon Abramson	10,017	6.98%
Democratic	Morgan L. Amaimo	1,280	0.89%
Democratic	William C. Lehnert	811	0.57%
Democratic	Rose Sapperstein	437	0.31%
Democratic	Milton Rothstein	429	0.30%
Democratic	Thomas C. Stinett	414	0.29%
Total votes		143,418	

=== Republican primary ===
Republican primary results
Party	Candidate	Votes	%
Republican	Theodore McKeldin	16,694	74.37%
Republican	Samuel A. Culotta	4,675	20.83%
Republican	Dorothy B. Davis	1,078	4.80%
Total votes		22,447	

== General election ==
The general election was held May 7.

Baltimore mayoral general election, 1963
Party	Candidate	Votes	%
Republican	Theodore McKeldin	108,427	51.10%
Democratic	Philip H. Goodman (incumbent)	103,761	48.90%
Total votes		212,188	
