= 1967 Baltimore mayoral election =

- November 2, 1967
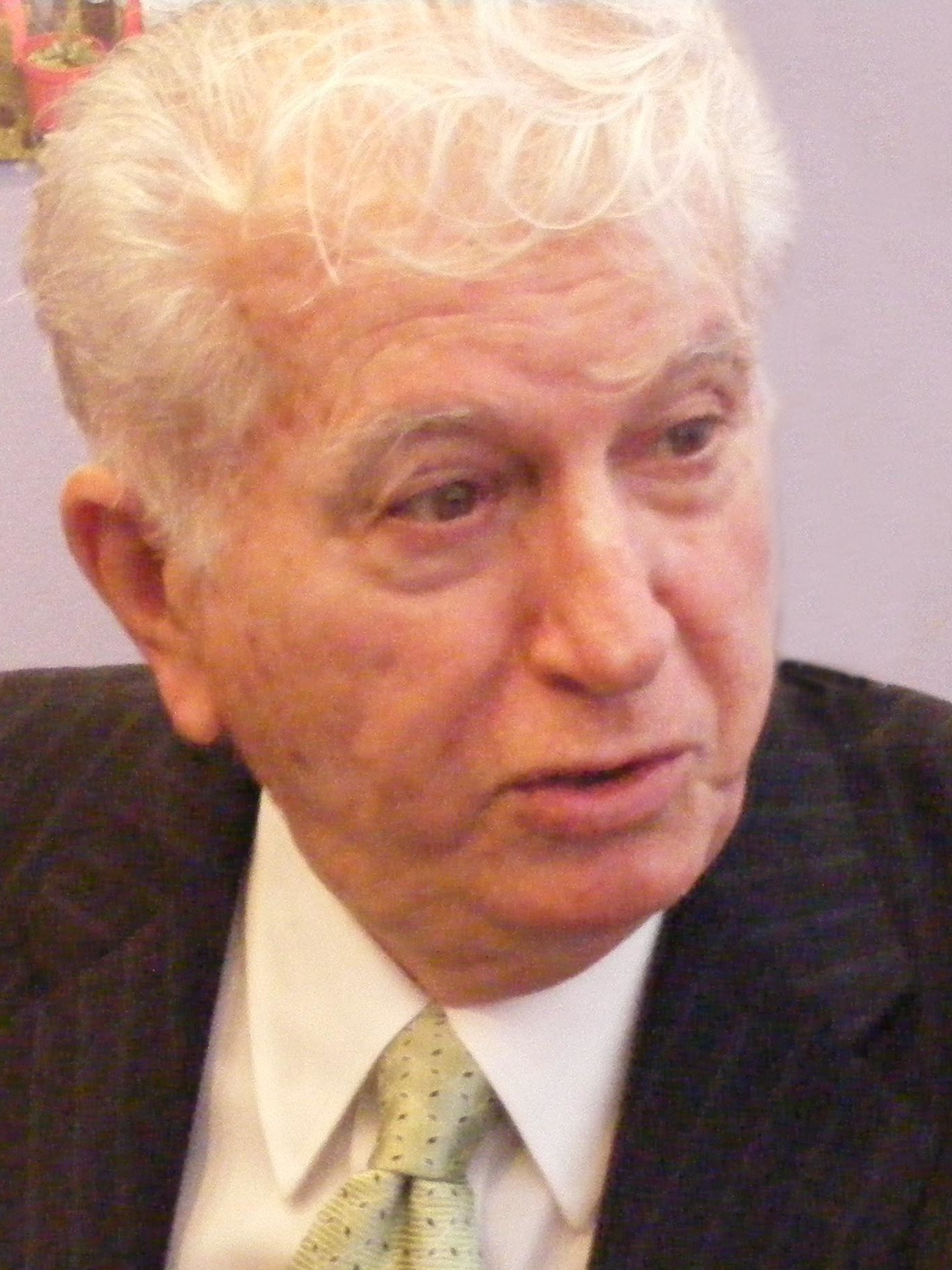

| Candidate | Thomas D'Alesandro III | Arthur W. Sherwood |
| Party | Democratic | Republican |
| Popular vote | 138,938 | 28,528 |
| Percentage | 82.97% | 17.04% |
Mayor before election
Theodore McKeldin
Republican
Elected mayor
Thomas D'Alesandro III
Democratic

The 1967 Baltimore mayoral election saw the election of Thomas D'Alesandro III.

== Nominations ==
Primary elections were held March 7.

=== Democratic primary ===
Democratic primary results
| Party | Candidate | Votes | % |
|---|---|---|---|
| Democratic | Thomas D'Alesandro III | 91,965 | 75.01% |
| Democratic | Peter Angelos | 30,641 | 24.99% |
| Total votes | | 122,606 | |

=== Republican primary ===
Republican primary results
| Party | Candidate | Votes | % |
|---|---|---|---|
| Republican | Arthur W. Sherwood | 7,551 | 52.89% |
| Republican | Samuel A. Culotta | 4,800 | 33.62% |
| Republican | Samuel D. Shapiro | 1,927 | 13.50% |
| Total votes | | 14,278 | |

== General election ==
The general election was held November 2.

Baltimore mayoral general election, 1967
| Party | Candidate | Votes | % |
|---|---|---|---|
| Democratic | Thomas D'Alesandro III | 138,938 | 82.97% |
| Republican | Arthur W. Sherwood | 28,528 | 17.04% |
| Total votes | | 167,466 | |
