= Ruark =

Surname

Ruark is a surname. Notable people with the surname include:

- Arthur Ruark (1899–1979), American physicist
- Davis R. Ruark (born 1955), former State's Attorney for Wicomico County, Maryland
- Gibbons Ruark (born 1941), contemporary American poet
- Jeanne Ruark Hoff, former college basketball player
- Rebecca T. Ruark, Chesapeake Bay skipjack
- Robert Ruark (1915–1965), American author and syndicated columnist

== See also ==
- Ruark number, a dimensionless number see in fluid mechanics
