= John P. Angelos =

American businessman (born 1967)

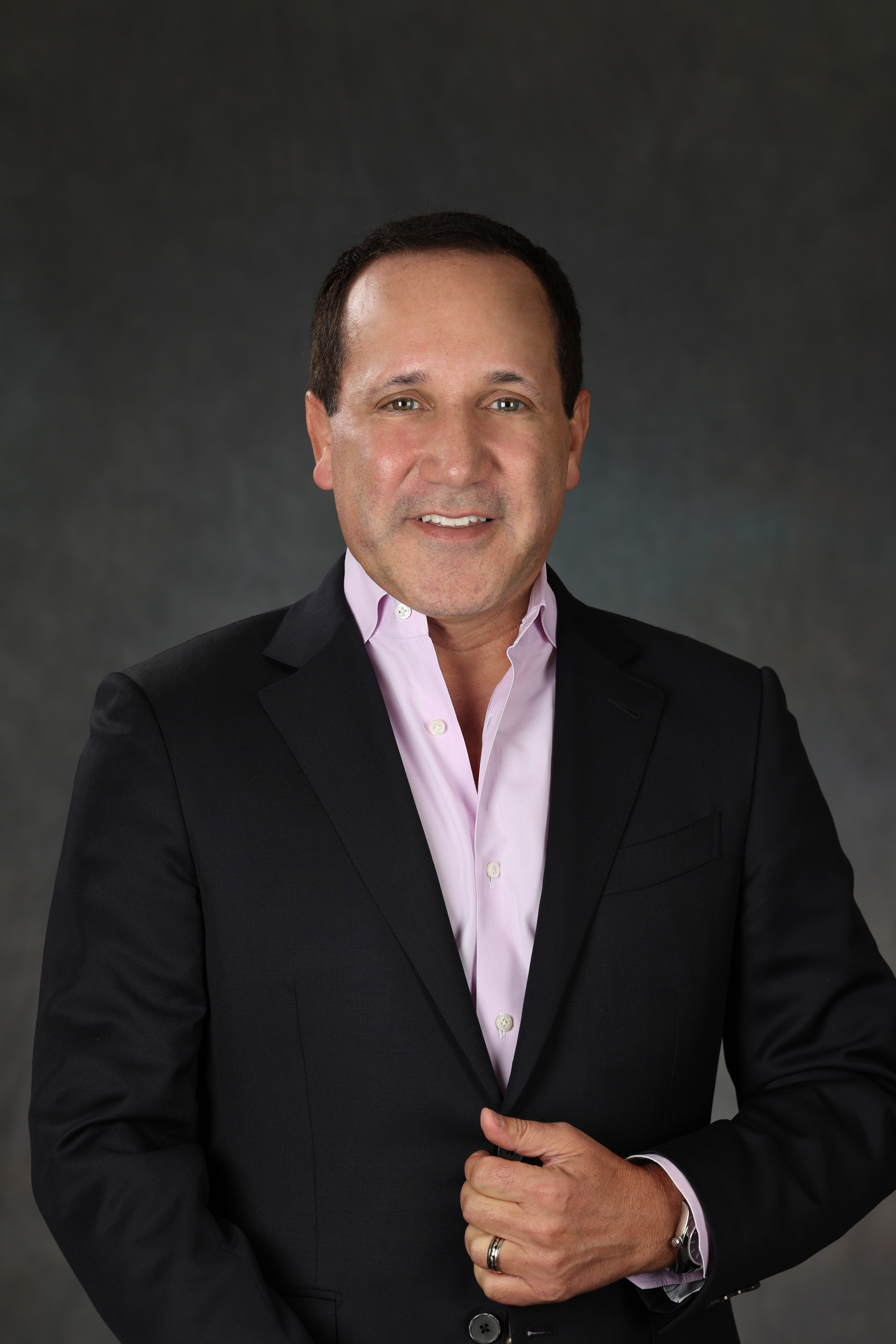
- Born: May 14, 1967 (age 59)
- Education: Duke University; University of Baltimore School of Law
- Occupation: President and COO, MASN
- Parent(s): Peter G. Angelos and Georgia Angelos

John P. Angelos (born May 14, 1967) is an American businessman who ran the Baltimore Orioles from 2020 until its sale to David Rubenstein in 2024, leading the club's front office and overseeing day-to-day business operations. Previously, he served as the Orioles' COO and executive vice president, a position he held since 1999. He also served as president and chief operating officer of the Mid-Atlantic Sports Network (MASN), overseeing the network's business operations. Angelos is the elder son of Baltimore Orioles owner Peter Angelos.

== Baltimore Orioles ==
Angelos managed the day-to-day business operations of the Baltimore Orioles, overseeing marketing and advertising, branding and promotion, major corporate sponsorship sales and ticket sales, governmental and public affairs, media and public relations, ballpark facility design and management, event operations, concessions rights negotiation and self-operation.

=== Kevin Brown suspension ===
On August 7, 2023, a tweet published by Matt Jergensen claimed that Angelos was responsible for the absence of Kevin Brown, lead broadcaster for the Orioles, since July 23. Awful Announcing on Twitter added a video clip, claiming Brown's comments prior to July 23 on the Orioles' past poor performance against the Tampa Bay Rays were to blame. According to unknown sources, the quote "The Orioles have won more games against them this season than the last two combined." was the cause of the suspension. It was found that despite there being an approved on-screen graphic and approved game notes for this statistic, "ownership took exception to Brown pointing it out ... believing it made them sound cheap." This sparked general outrage by fans, journalists, and fellow broadcasters across the MLB, including rival teams of the Orioles such as the New York Yankees. Most of this outrage was directed at Angelos, who was believed to have ordered this suspension, and many called for an immediate reversal of the suspension.

In response, "A senior Orioles official communicated to [Awful Announcing] 'We don’t comment on personnel matters' and 'We look forward to hearing Kevin’s voice soon.' Additionally, [the Orioles] dispute our reporting that any suspension took place." On August 11, Brown released a statement on Twitter stating he had a positive relationship with the front office and mutual respect with John Angelos. Regarding the recent controversy and media coverage Brown stated, "Unfortunately, recent media reports have mischaracterized my relationship with my adopted hometown Orioles. The fact is that I have a wonderful relationship with the organization, and our ownership and front office has fully supported me since 2019 when I first came aboard." He returned to air later that day to announce his first game since his reported suspension. John Angelos has not publicly commented on this controversy nor the purported existence of the suspension.

=== New spring training location ===
Angelos served as a lead negotiator with various Florida communities over renovating the team's facility in Fort Lauderdale and ultimately relocating Orioles' spring training to Sarasota. Throughout the five-year process, Angelos and the organization fielded offers from at least four cities in Florida for the Orioles' new spring training home. Initial efforts were focused on renovating the Orioles' existing facility in Fort Lauderdale. Facing setbacks in negotiations, Angelos and the Orioles turned to Fort Myers, Sarasota, and Vero Beach. On November 12, 2008, Sarasota, Florida made a $30 million offer to the Orioles, and Vero Beach, Florida made a formal offer on November 17, 2008. On July 22, 2009, the Orioles announced an agreement with Sarasota, Florida to move spring training operations to Ed Smith Stadium for 2010.

As part of the public-private partnership with Sarasota, Angelos developed a "sisterhood city" integrated marketing approach to capitalize on the power of the Baltimore Orioles and Major League Baseball to create economic impact through tourism incubation for the city. The approach utilizes the Orioles' media assets to market Sarasota to consumers in the Mid-Atlantic region year-round. According to the Sarasota Convention and Visitors Bureau, visits and inquiries from Mid-Atlantic residents have increased by double digits since the partnership began. The partnership was recognized by industry publication Sports Business Journal for providing the "marketing muscle" necessary to generate the tourist dollars that are "more important than ever to making the spring training business equation work." In late 2013, the Tampa Bay Business Journal heralded the results of the partnership in a cover story, describing the deal as a home run for Sarasota's tourism industry.

Ed Smith Stadium and Twin Lakes Park underwent a $36 million renovation prior to the 2011 season. In addition to Sarasota County's $24 million contribution and the State of Florida's $7.2 million contribution, the city of Sarasota and Sarasota County donated 80 acres on two complexes for the renovation project. The Baltimore Orioles added another $5 million in discretionary funds toward the renovation, bringing the total cost of the public and private funded project to over $36 million. Working closely with Angelos, David Schwarz Architects of Washington, DC and Hoyt Architects of Sarasota, Florida led the renovation efforts. The renovations received acclaim from Sports Business Journal.

=== "People to People" series with Cuba ===
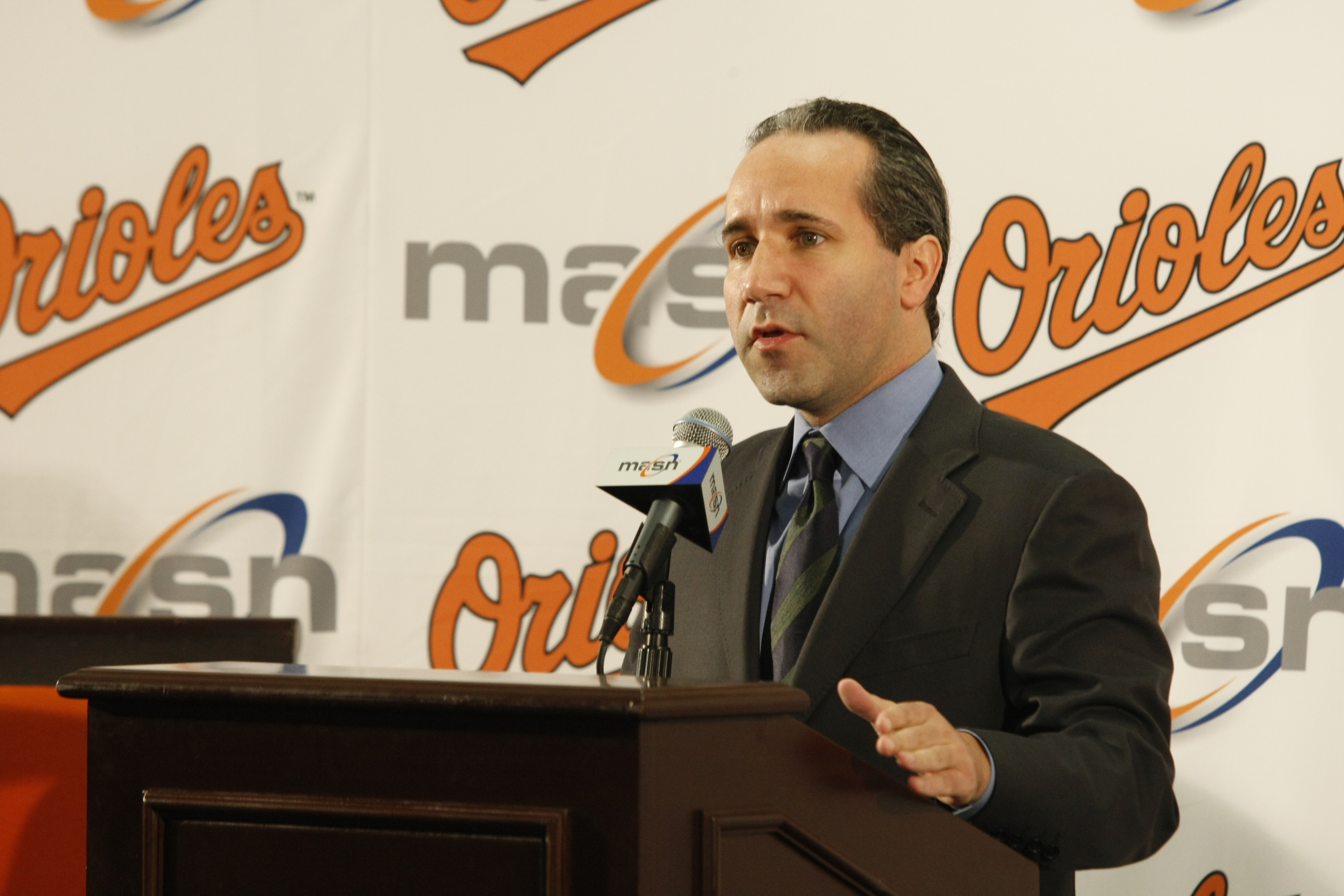
Angelos and the Baltimore Orioles introduce a partnership with Baltimore City Schools in 2009

Angelos was a representative of the Orioles franchise in the tripartite discussions between the team, the Cuban government, and the United States government and several of its agencies that culminated in the historic games between the Orioles and the Cuban National Baseball Team at Oriole Park at Camden Yards and in Havana, Cuba in March 1999. He and his brother, attorney Louis Angelos, led a delegation of team and baseball officials to Havana to negotiate the final agreement for the two-game series.

== Lawsuit by brother ==
He was sued by his brother, Louis, for, among other things, allegedly moving $90 million of his father's assets into an LLC he controls and manipulating his mother into allowing him to take full control of all family assets, including the Baltimore Orioles.

== MASN ==
Angelos led the launch of MASN as a full-time network in 2005. MASN is available on basic cable, satellite, and telecom systems to 18 million viewers throughout Maryland, Virginia, Washington D.C. and parts of Pennsylvania, North Carolina, Delaware and West Virginia.

At MASN, Angelos negotiated dozens of carriage agreements throughout the territory and oversaw carriage-related public affairs, government relations and supporting litigation at FCC and Appellate Court proceedings including the ongoing carriage dispute with Time Warner Cable. In addition to managing the day-to-day business operations of the network, he oversaw MASN's transition to HD along with other programming and production enhancements including on-site 15 minute pre and post-game shows live from Nationals Park and Oriole Park at Camden Yards. In 2010, Angelos was named as one of the top ten decision-makers on in-market MLB streaming by Sports Business Journal.

In several interviews with Toronto sports radio host Joey Vendetta, Angelos discussed the development of MASN, the value of sports television rights fees and the current landscape of regional sports networks. Additionally, on a panel at the Leadership in Sponsorship 2014 conference, Angelos discussed how the development of MASN allowed the Orioles to integrate assets and content to build a 360-degree, multiplatform sales and sponsorship strategy.

== Criticism of Major League Baseball ==
Angelos is a vocal advocate for introducing parity mechanisms in Major League Baseball to develop competitive balance in the league. In various speaking engagements, interviews and in a cover story with SportsPro Magazine, Angelos has described the many disadvantages for small and mid-market teams within Major League Baseball's decentralized model. Angelos argues that introducing a salary cap and floor would reduce payroll inequality and allow small market teams to keep pace with baseball's wealthiest, big market teams. He argues that successful small market teams like Oakland and Tampa Bay have historically overcome extraordinary economic disadvantages to compete successfully with the league's biggest spenders.

Angelos often points to the NFL's centralized revenue-sharing model and parity mechanisms as a key foundation of the league's enormous success, especially in smaller markets. He also argues that greater exposure for small market teams in national television broadcast schedules – similar to NFL scheduling – would showcase the combined strength of baseball's franchises and create a stronger, more balanced league.

== Racing and gaming industry ==
A lifelong supporter of Thoroughbred racing, Angelos serves on the board of the directors of the Maryland Million, an annual one-day program of 11 races. Angelos has also managed breeding interests and has participated in other racing and breeding-related partnerships in Maryland, New York and across the East Coast. Additionally, he brought popular New York Thoroughbred racing – including Saturdays at Saratoga – to viewers throughout MASN's seven-state territory.

Most recently, Angelos developed, distributed and served as executive producer of At the Post Live, an interactive racing show featuring horse racing personality and analyst Andy Serling with special guests live from Hattie's Restaurant in Saratoga Springs, New York. At the Post Live airs throughout the Albany region on ESPN Radio 104.5 FM and online at ESPN's 1045theTeam.com as well as on the Daily Racing Form every Thursday evening. Throughout the season, special guests have included Hall of Fame trainer Nick Zito, elite trainers Kiaran McLaughlin, Chad Brown, Dale Romans and Ian Wilkes, Breeder's Cup champion jockeys Rosie Napravnik and Ramon Dominguez, Washington Post journalist, and creator of the industry-changing Beyer Speed Figures, Andy Beyer, and Daily Racing Form publisher and noted author and columnist, Steve Crist.

In its first year, the program had strong local advertising support from a variety of corporate, nonprofit and media sponsors including Parting Glass Racing, the Christopher Dailey Foundation, ESPN Radio 104.5, Thoroughbred Building Solutions, Special Olympics New York, Hattie's Restaurant, New York Thoroughbred Breeders Inc., Daily Racing Form, Permanently Disabled Jockey's Fund, Saratoga Hospital Foundation and Camden Sports Productions.

Additionally, Angelos is actively involved in philanthropic endeavors to support the racing community. He is an active supporter of the Thoroughbred Retirement Foundation—an equine sanctuary for retired Thoroughbred racehorses – and has donated a number of sports experience packages to benefit the organization's annual gala. He has also donated similar packages to the Saratoga Hospital Foundation's Summer Benefit Auction as well as other local and industry fundraisers.

== Political activity ==
Outside of the sports and entertainment industries, John Angelos has been politically active and a strong supporter of Democratic candidates and organizations both nationally and in Maryland.

In the past, he donated to the Democratic Senatorial Campaign Committee, the DNC Services Corp, Presidential candidates Joe Biden and Barack Obama, Congressman John Sarbanes, Democratic candidate for Congress Frank Kratovil, the Missouri Democratic State Committee, the Indiana Democratic Congressional Victory Committee and the Democratic Party of Colorado.
