= University of Baltimore School of Law =

Public law school in Baltimore, Maryland, US

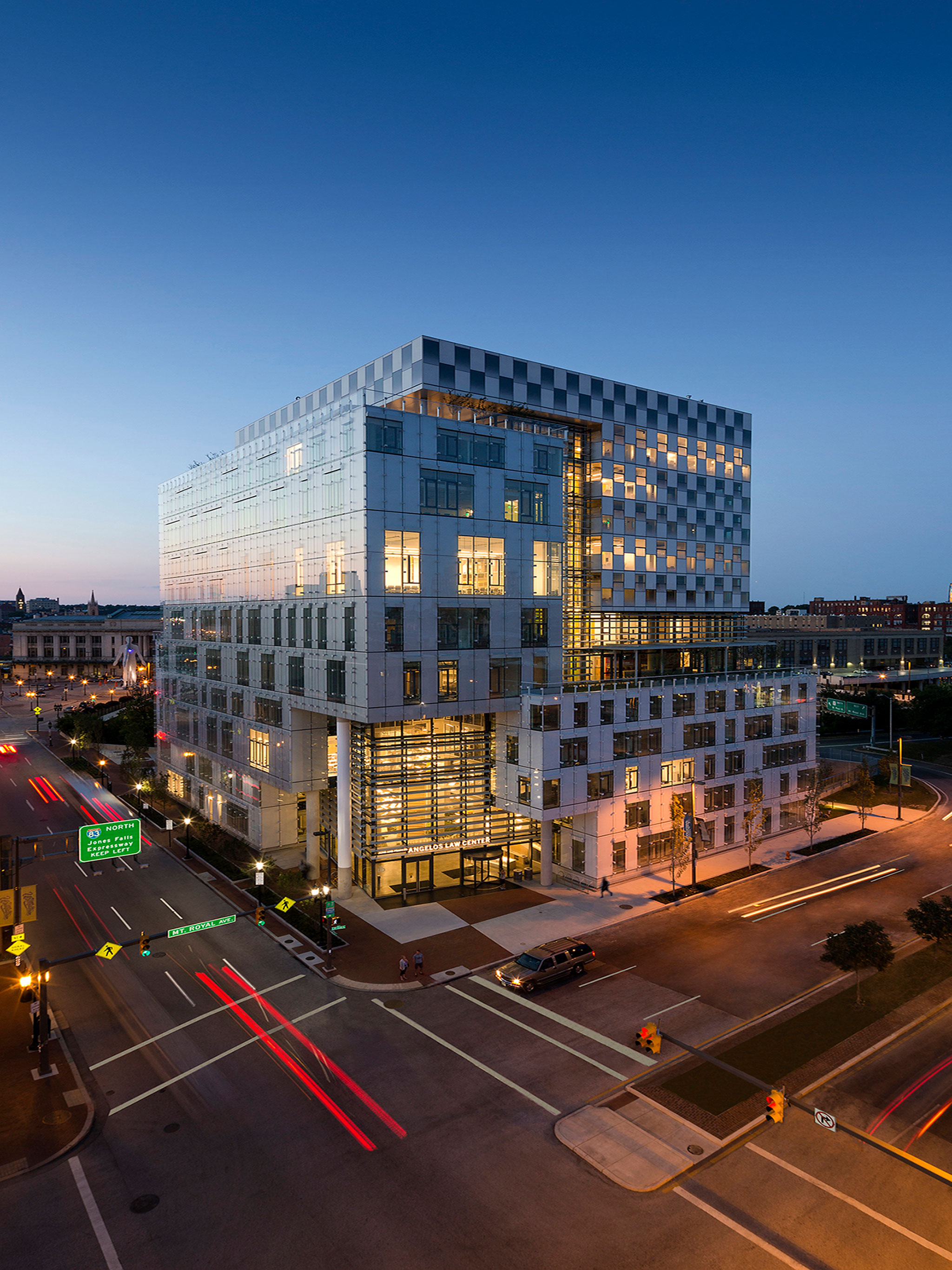
- Parent school: University of Baltimore
- Established: 1925; 101 years ago
- School type: Public law school
- Dean: LaVonda Reed
- Location: Baltimore, Maryland, U.S. 39.30622°N 76.617212°W
- Enrollment: 700 (October 2024)
- Faculty: 57 (full–time), 114 (part–time)
- USNWR ranking: 139th (tied) (2025)
- Bar pass rate: 70.71% (2024 first-time takers)
- Website: law.ubalt.edu

The University of Baltimore School of Law is one of the four colleges that make up the University of Baltimore, which is part of the University System of Maryland. The UBalt School of Law is one of only two law schools in the state of Maryland, the other being the University of Maryland Francis King Carey School of Law. The University of Baltimore School of Law is housed in the John and Frances Angelos Law Center, at the northeast corner of West Mount Royal Avenue and North Charles Street on the University of Baltimore campus in the city's Mt. Vernon cultural district. The 12-story building, designed by German architect Stefan Behnisch, opened in April 2013 and was rated LEED-Platinum by the U.S. Green Building Council.

== Admissions ==
For the class entering in 2024, the law school accepted 575 out of 1,164 applicants (a 49.40% acceptance rate), with 217 of those accepted enrolling, a 37.74% yield rate (the percentage of accepted students who enrolled). Seven students were not included in the acceptance statistics. The class consists of 224 students. The median LSAT score was 153 and the median undergraduate GPA was 3.42. Three students were not included in the GPA calculation and two not included in the LSAT calculation. The reported 25th/75th percentile LSAT scores and GPAs were 151/156 and 3.10/3.63.

== Post-graduation employment and academics ==
=== Employment outcomes ===
Of the Class of 2017 graduates, 60.27% found employment in positions for which bar admission was required (i.e., as attorneys). An additional 12.5% of the Class of 2017 found employment in positions for which a J.D. was an advantage. (Of 224 graduates, 96.9% reported their employment status.) 25.45% of graduates secured state or local judicial clerkships, while none secured federal clerkships. Most graduates were employed in firms of 2 –10 members, with most graduates employed in Maryland, seven employed in the District of Columbia, and five employed in Virginia.

=== Costs ===
The School of Law's total cost for full-time attendance (tuition and fees) is $31,954 for in-state residents and $46,622 for out-of-state residents for the 2018–2019 academic year. Students in Washington, D.C., and certain areas of Pennsylvania, Delaware, and northern Virginia are eligible to receive Maryland in-state tuition.

=== Degrees and concentrations ===
The UBalt School of Law offers the juris doctor (J.D.) degree and master's degrees (LL.M.) in tax and U.S. law. The school offers several concentrations for J.D. students, including: Business Law, Criminal Practice, Estate Planning, Family Law, Intellectual Property, International & Comparative Law, Litigation & Advocacy, Public and Governmental Service, Real Estate Practice and Tax Law.

In conjunction with the law school's and University's other programs and schools, the law school offers joint degree combinations of JD/MBA, JD/MPA, JD/MS in criminal justice, JD/MS in negotiations and conflict management, JD/Ph.D. in policy science and JD/LL.M. in taxation.

=== Publications ===
- University of Baltimore Law Review
- University of Baltimore Law Forum

== Notable alumni ==
Notable UBalt Law graduates include:

=== Vice presidents ===
- Spiro Agnew (LL.B 1947) - Former Governor of Maryland (R), and resigned as 39th Vice President of the United States under Richard Nixon

=== Judges ===
- Theresa Adams (JD 1986), Associate Judge, Frederick County Circuit Court (2004-present)
- Arrie W. Davis (JD 1969) - Associate Judge, Maryland Court of Special Appeals (1990–2010)
- Robert F. Fischer (LL.B 1961) - Judge, Maryland Court of Special Appeals (1988 - 1977)
- Shirley Brannock Jones (JD 1946) - Judge, United States District Court for the District of Maryland (1979-1982)
- Laurie McKinnon (JD 1986) - Associate Justice of the Montana Supreme Court (2013-present)
- Katie O'Malley (JD 1991) - former Associate Judge, Baltimore (2001-2021) and, through her husband Martin O'Malley, former First Lady of Baltimore (1999-2007) and First Lady of Maryland (2007-2015)

=== State-level attorneys ===
- J. Joseph Curran, Jr. (D) (LL.B 1959) - Former Attorney General of Maryland, former Lt. Governor of Maryland
- Davis R. Ruark (D) (JD 1981) - former State's Attorney for Wicomico County, Maryland

=== Governors and mayors ===
- Samuel Walter Bogley, III (D) (JD 1967) - former Lt. Governor of Maryland
- Philip H. Goodman (1931) - former Mayor of Baltimore and senator
- William Donald Schaefer (D) (LL.B 1942; LL.M 1954) - former Mayor of Baltimore, Governor, & Comptroller of Maryland
- Melvin Steinberg (D) (JD 1955) - former Lt. Governor of Maryland, former President of the Maryland Senate

=== U.S. congressmen and delegates ===
- Curt Anderson (D) (JD 1982) - former Maryland State Delegate, Districts 44 and 43
- Ben Barnes (D) (JD 2003) - Maryland State Delegate, District 21
- Charles Boutin (R) (JD 1970) - former member of Maryland House of Delegates
- Jill P. Carter (D) (JD 1992) - former member of the Maryland Senate (2018-2025) and Maryland State Delegate, District 41 (2003-2017)
- Allen C. K. Clark (R) - former member of Maryland House of Delegates, Anne Arundel County
- Michael G. Comeau (D) (JD 1981) - former member of Maryland House of Delegates
- George W. Della Jr. (D) (JD 1972) - Maryland State Senate, District 46 (1983-2011)
- Thomas E. Dewberry (D) (JD 1977) - judge and former member of the Maryland House of Delegates
- Ronald Donatucci (D) (JD 1974) - former Philadelphia Register of Wills (1980-2020) and Pennsylvania State Representative (1977-1980)
- Bill Emerson (R) (LL.B 1964) - U.S. Congressman, Missouri (1981-1996)
- Donald C. Fry (D) (JD 1979) - former Maryland State Senator and Delegate
- Keith E. Haynes (D) (JD 1991) - former Maryland State Delegate, District 44, Baltimore
- Shaneka Henson (D) (JD 2010) - Maryland Senate member (2025-present) and former State Delegate, District 30A (2019-2025)
- Frank Kratovil (D) (JD 1994) - U.S. Congressman, Maryland (2009-2011); Judge, Queen Anne's County District Court (2012-present)
- Joe Lentol (D) (JD 1968) - former representative, New York State Assembly, District 50 (1973-2021)
- Dutch Ruppersberger (D) (JD 1970) - U.S. Congressman, Maryland (2003-2025)
- Joseph F. Vallario Jr. (D) (LL.B, JD 1963) - Maryland State Delegate District 27A, Prince George's County

=== Sports executives ===
- John Angelos (JD) - former Executive Vice President of the Baltimore Orioles (2020-2024)
- Peter Angelos (LL.B 1961) former majority owner of the Baltimore Orioles (1993-2024)
- Tom Condon (JD 1981) - sports agent, named the most powerful agent in football by Sporting News, represents over 120 players
- Pat Moriarty (JD 2008) - Senior Vice President of Football Administration for the Baltimore Ravens

=== Other alumni ===
- Kendel Sibiski Ehrlich (LL.B 1987) - Former First Lady of Maryland through husband Robert L. Ehrlich, Jr.
- Kevin B. Kamenetz JD 1982) - County Executive of Baltimore County, Maryland
- Jeffrey Kluger (JD) - author, journalist
- John Clark Mayden (JD 1978) - photographer
- Steven Milloy (JD) - author, commentator
- John E. Morrison (LL.B. 1939) – US Air Force major general
- Bishop Robinson (JD 1986)- former Police Commissioner of Baltimore
- Stan White (JD 1978) - Sports analyst for the Baltimore Ravens and former NFL linebacker
- Hyman A. Pressman (LL.B. 1933) – City Comptroller of Baltimore 1963–1991

==== Fictional alumni ====
- Cedric Daniels - former Baltimore Police Commissioner character in the fictional television series The Wire

== List of Deans ==
- John H. Hessey - 1952-1969
- Joseph Curtis - 1972-1977
- Laurence Katz - 1978-1993
- John A. Sebert - 1993-2000
- Gilbert Holmes - 2001-2007
- Phillip Closius - 2007-2011
- Ronald Weich - 2012-2024
- LaVonda Reed - 2024-present
