= Theresa Adams =

American judge

Theresa M. Adams

Associate Judge for the Circuit Court for Frederick County
- Incumbent
- Assumed office March 9, 2004

Personal details
- Born: Frederick, Maryland, U.S.
- Education: Mount St. Mary's University (BA); University of Baltimore School of Law (JD)

Theresa Adams is an Associate Judge for the Frederick County Circuit Court, 6th Judicial Circuit in Frederick, Maryland.

== Early life and education ==
Adams was born in Frederick, Maryland. She attended Mount Saint Mary's College, receiving a bachelor of arts in foreign languages in 1977. She later attended University of Baltimore School of Law, graduating in 1986 with a Juris Doctor.

== Career ==
Adams began her legal career as an Assistant State's Attorney in 1990 in Frederick County, Maryland. In 1994, she became the Senior Assistant State's Attorney in Carroll County, Maryland. From 2002 to 2003, she was an Assistant State's Attorney in Washington County.

On January 9, 2004, Adams became an Associate Judge for the Frederick County Circuit Court. From 2007-2015, she served as a member of the Foster Care Court-Improvement Implementation Committee. She was also a Circuit Representative for the Conference of Circuit Judges from 2011-2018.

In 2021, Adams joined the Juvenile Law Committee for the Judicial Council.
