= 1951 Baltimore mayoral election =

- May 8, 1951
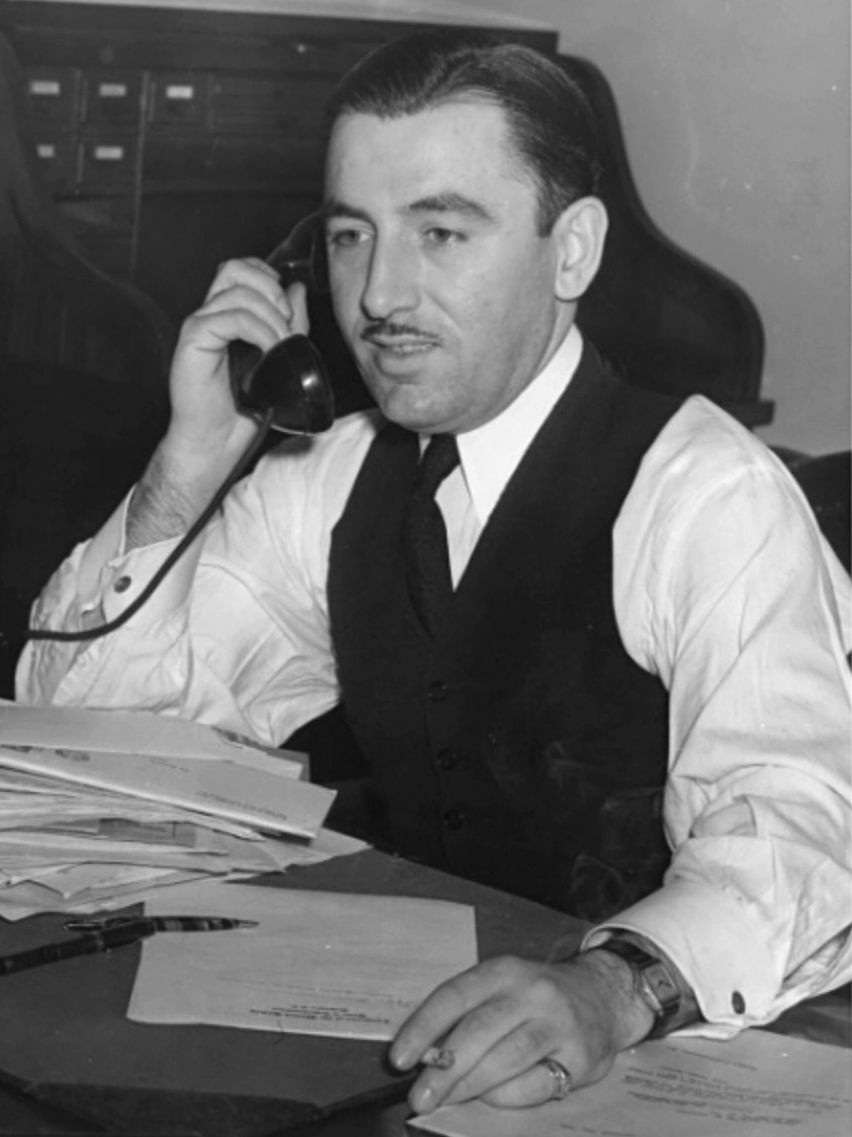

| Candidate | Thomas D'Alesandro Jr. | Joseph L. Carter |
| Party | Democratic | Republican |
| Popular vote | 112,927 | 61,801 |
| Percentage | 64.63% | 35.37% |
Mayor before election
Thomas D'Alesandro Jr.
Democratic
Elected mayor
Thomas D'Alesandro Jr.
Democratic

The 1951 Baltimore mayoral election saw the reelection of Thomas D'Alesandro Jr.

== General election ==
The general election was held May 8.

Baltimore mayoral general election, 1951
| Party | Candidate | Votes | % |
|---|---|---|---|
| Democratic | Thomas D'Alesandro Jr. (incumbent) | 112,927 | 64.63% |
| Republican | Joseph L. Carter | 61,801 | 35.37% |
| Total votes | | 174,728 | |
