= 1950 Maryland gubernatorial election =

- November 7, 1950
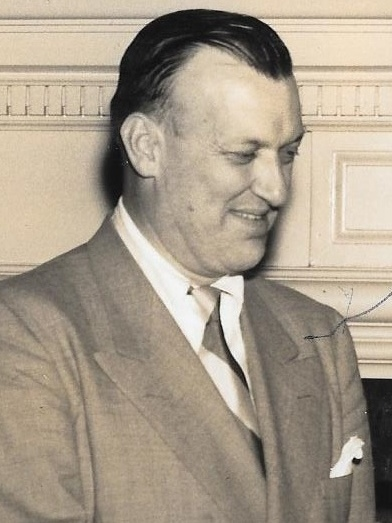

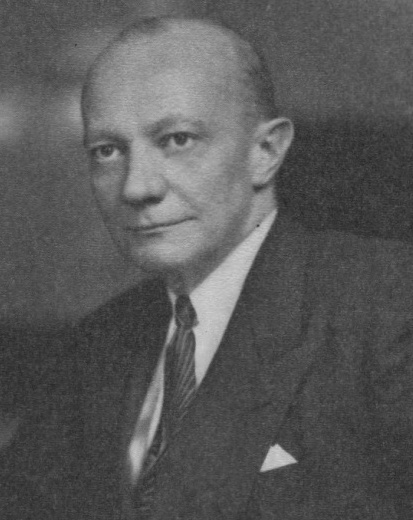
Nominee	Theodore McKeldin	William Preston Lane Jr.
Party	Republican	Democratic
Popular vote	369,807	275,824
Percentage	57.28%	42.72%
- County results McKeldin: 50–60% 60–70% Lane: 50–60%
Governor before election
William Preston Lane Jr.
Democratic
Elected Governor
Theodore McKeldin
Republican

The 1950 Maryland gubernatorial election was held on November 7, 1950. Republican nominee Theodore McKeldin defeated Democratic incumbent William Preston Lane Jr. with 57.28% of the vote.

== Primary elections ==
Primary elections were held on September 18, 1950.

=== Democratic primary ===
==== Candidates ====
- William Preston Lane Jr., incumbent Governor of Maryland
- George P. Mahoney, perennial candidate
- Herbert William Larrabee
- Harry Kemper
- Stephen B. Peddicord

==== Results ====
In the primary election of September 18, 1950, Gov. Lane faced opposition from George P. Mahoney, a perennial office-seeker. Lane won the election by carrying sixteen counties and one district in Baltimore City to capture the unit vote although Mahoney gained a majority in the popular vote.

Democratic primary results
Party	Candidate	Votes	%
Democratic	William Preston Lane Jr. (incumbent)	173,611	45.52
Democratic	George P. Mahoney	191,193	50.13
Democratic	Herbert William Larrabee	6,649	1.74
Democratic	Harry Kemper	5,426	1.42
Democratic	Stephen B. Peddicord	4,496	1.18
Total votes		381,375	100.00

== General election ==
=== Candidates ===
- Theodore McKeldin, Republican
- William Preston Lane Jr., Democratic

=== Results ===
1950 Maryland gubernatorial election
Party	Candidate	Votes	%	±%
Republican	Theodore McKeldin	369,807	57.28%	
Democratic	William Preston Lane Jr. (incumbent)	275,824	42.72%	
Majority		93,983		
Turnout		645,631		
Republican gain from Democratic		Swing		
