= Arrie W. Davis =

American judge

Honorable Arrie W. Davis

Judge, Maryland Court of Special Appeals
- In office 1990–2010
- Nominated by: Governor William Donald Schaefer

Judge, Circuit Court for Baltimore City
- In office 1983–1990
- Nominated by: Governor Harry R. Hughes

District Court of Maryland
- In office 1981–1983

Arrie W. Davis (born July 21, 1940) is an American lawyer and jurist from Baltimore, Maryland. Until his retirement in July 2010, he was an associate judge on the Maryland Court of Special Appeals.

== Background ==
Davis was born in Baltimore, Maryland, where he attended primary and secondary public schools, graduating from the Frederick Douglass Senior High School in 1959. He earned a Bachelor of Arts degree from Morgan State College in 1963, Master of Arts from New York University in 1966 and his juris doctor from the University of Baltimore School of Law in 1969. Davis was admitted to Maryland Bar in 1969, the U.S. District Court for District of Maryland bar and the U.S. Court of Appeals for 4th Circuit in 1972 and U.S. Supreme Court bar in 1973. During the 1970s, Davis taught law courses at Morgan State University (1971–81) and the Villa Julie College (1972–80).

== Judicial career ==
On March 2, 1981, Davis was first appointed to the bench in Maryland: Associate Judge, District Court of Maryland for District 1 located in Baltimore City. Two years later he was elevated to the Baltimore City Circuit Court, 8th Judicial Circuit where he served as an associate judge for 7 years. On December 27, 1990, he was named to Maryland's second highest court where he has served as a member of the Legislative Committee, 1989–91, Executive Committee, 1995–97, and the Civil Law and Procedure Committee, 1998-2001 of the Maryland Judicial Conference.
