= 1946 Maryland gubernatorial election =

- November 5, 1946
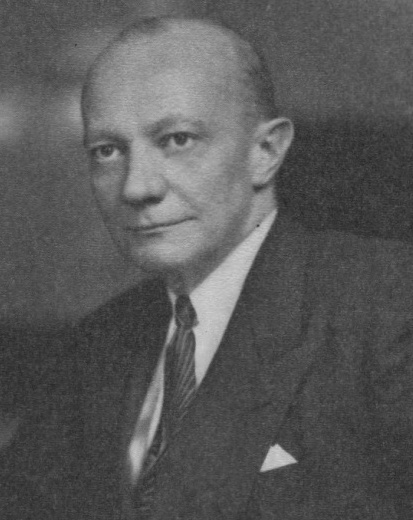

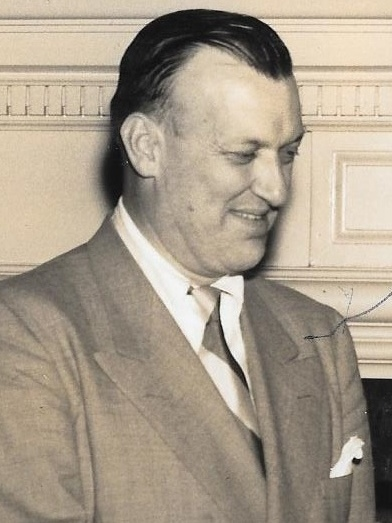
Nominee	William Preston Lane Jr.	Theodore McKeldin
Party	Democratic	Republican
Popular vote	268,084	221,752
Percentage	54.73%	45.27%
- County results Lane: 50–60% 60–70% McKeldin: 50–60% 60–70%
Governor before election
Herbert O'Conor
Democratic
Elected Governor
William Preston Lane Jr.
Democratic

The 1946 Maryland gubernatorial election was held on Tuesday, November 5, to elect next the Governor of Maryland. Democratic candidate William Preston Lane Jr. defeated Republican candidate and former mayor of Baltimore and Future Governor of Maryland Theodore McKeldin.

== General election ==
=== Candidates ===
- William Preston Lane Jr., Democratic
- Theodore McKeldin, Republican

=== Results ===
1946 Maryland gubernatorial election
Party	Candidate	Votes	%	±%
Democratic	William Preston Lane Jr.	268,084	54.73%	
Republican	Theodore McKeldin	221,752	45.27%	
Majority		46,332		
Turnout		489,836		
Democratic hold		Swing		
