= Sidney Hollander Award =

Award for work towards obtaining equal rights for African Americans in Maryland, US

The Sidney Hollander Award was an award for work towards obtaining equal rights for African Americans, given by the Sidney Hollander Foundation, in Baltimore, Maryland, USA.

== History ==
The Sidney Hollander Foundation created the Sidney Hollander Award after World War II. This award was given to a person who had worked diligently towards obtaining equal rights for African Americans in Maryland, and who had helped to achieve equal rights for all citizens of the United States. Segregation was a huge issue that both African Americans and whites were forced to deal with during this time period. While African Americans had gained a number of rights, including the right to vote, they were still treated unfairly. They were forced to use different entrances to stores and different bathrooms, and a number of them were not given proper job opportunities in fields in which they were well qualified.

The Sidney Hollander Award was handed out every year from 1947 through 1963. Recipients included organizations such as The Baltimore Sun newspaper, the Baltimore City Medical Society, and Loyola College. These organizations all helped to spread the word that African Americans should be treated as equal human beings in Maryland. While several awards went to organizations, there were also a few that went to individuals. They included Robert Freedman, Baltimore mayor and Maryland governor Theodore R. McKeldin and Thomas J. S. Waxter, all important men in Maryland during this time period and all dedicated to desegregation in the state.

In 1964, the Sidney Hollander Foundation realized that the government, religious organizations, and political parties were all finally dealing with the issue of desegregation in Maryland, and seeing it on a higher level that could possibly resolve the issue. The foundation announced that the award given the previous year would be the last. In the years in which the award was handed out, multiple advances were made in ending segregation in Maryland. Some people believe the Hollander Award was responsible for a number of the acts of desegregation, because it helped publicize what was being done in Maryland to help end segregation.

== Sidney Hollander ==
Sidney Hollander (1881–1972) was a Baltimore businessman and humanitarian who devoted time and resources to advocacy and social action in the fields of civil rights, social welfare and social reform. He was an officer and board member of multiple private and public philanthropic organizations and gained prominence in both local and national forums as a social activist and reformer, principally from 1938 to 1971.

== The Sidney Hollander Foundation ==
In December 1941, a foundation was set up in Hollander's honor. Hollander was an avid believer that all people should be afforded justice, civil rights, and equal opportunity for education, employment and housing. He felt that African Americans, especially, should be treated in the same way as any other American. Hollander wanted to create a place where everybody would be treated equally.
