= Santa Claus Anonymous =

Nonprofit

- Founded: 1934
- Type: Social
- Purpose: Children, Christmas gifts
- Location: Baltimore, MD
- Region served: Baltimore-Washington metropolitan area
- Method: Gift certificate distribution
- Employees: 1
- Website: santaclausanonymous.org
- Formerly called: Christmas Party Inc

Santa Claus Anonymous, Inc is a registered 501(c)(3) nonprofit Baltimore City based charity, that provides gift certificates to families in Baltimore City and seven neighboring counties in Maryland during the holiday season. The organization was founded in 1934 by Theodore McKeldin, Baltimore mayor. The organization raises funds within the Baltimore–Washington metropolitan area to provide holiday presents to children in need.

== History ==
The organization started out as a Christmas party organized in 1934 by the newly formed Baltimore Junior Association of Commerce to provide holiday gifts to 5,000 children from low-income households; the association was then headed by Theodore McKeldin who later became a mayor of Baltimore. A year later, three additional groups joined the association, the Junior League of Baltimore, Loews Century and the Evening Sun. The group held the biggest Christmas party in Baltimore in the later 1940s and 1950s, and the number of gift recipients grew from 5,000 to reach 7,000. In 1947, the organization then known as Christmas Party, Inc. began mailing gift certificates to a number of parents in low-income households from a list obtained from the Department of Welfare in Baltimore. The idea was that a gift from a parent is appreciated more by the children than a gift received from a stranger. In 1948, the group started an annual dance to benefit their mission. By 1956, the group changed the organization's name from Christmas Party, Inc to Santa Claus Anonymous.

== Activities ==
Santa Claus Anonymous hosts an annual wine and beer tasting fundraiser in December, supplemented by various year-long volunteer events. These efforts support the organization's core mission of raising holiday funds for children, replacing past events like the marathon football fundraiser.

== Category ==
Baltimore
