= 1955 Baltimore mayoral election =

- May 3, 1955
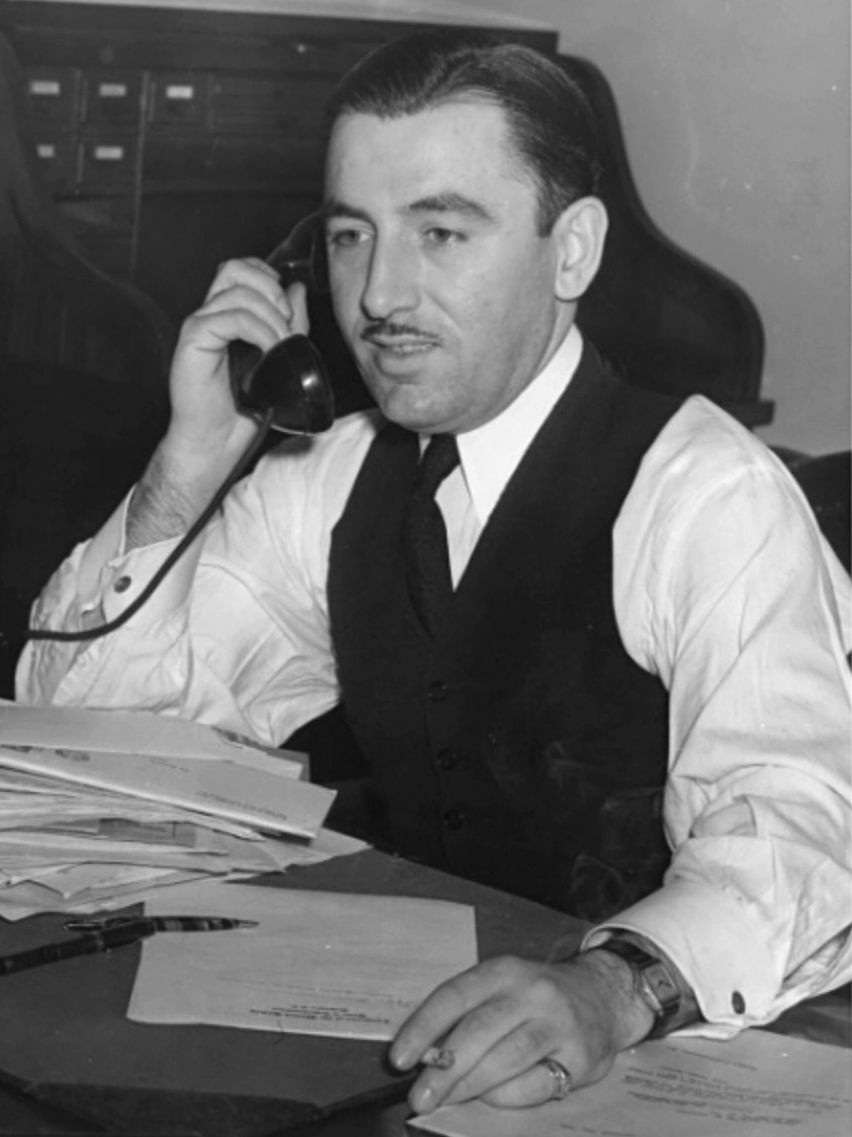

Candidate	Thomas D'Alesandro Jr.	Samuel Hopkins
Party	Democratic	Republican
Popular vote	119,413	95,349
Percentage	55.60%	44.40%
Mayor before election
Thomas D'Alesandro Jr.
Democratic
Elected mayor
Thomas D'Alesandro Jr.
Democratic

The 1955 Baltimore mayoral election saw reelection of Thomas D'Alesandro Jr. to a third consecutive term as mayor.

== General election ==
The general election was held May 3.

=== Campaign ===
D'Alesandro faced Republican Samuel Hopkins. Hopkins had served a four-year term in the Maryland House of Delegates, having been elected in 1950.

=== Results ===
Baltimore mayoral general election, 1955
Party	Candidate	Votes	%
Democratic	Thomas D'Alesandro Jr. (incumbent)	119,413	55.60%
Republican	Samuel Hopkins	95,349	44.40%
Total votes		214,762	
