= Philip H. Goodman =

American politician

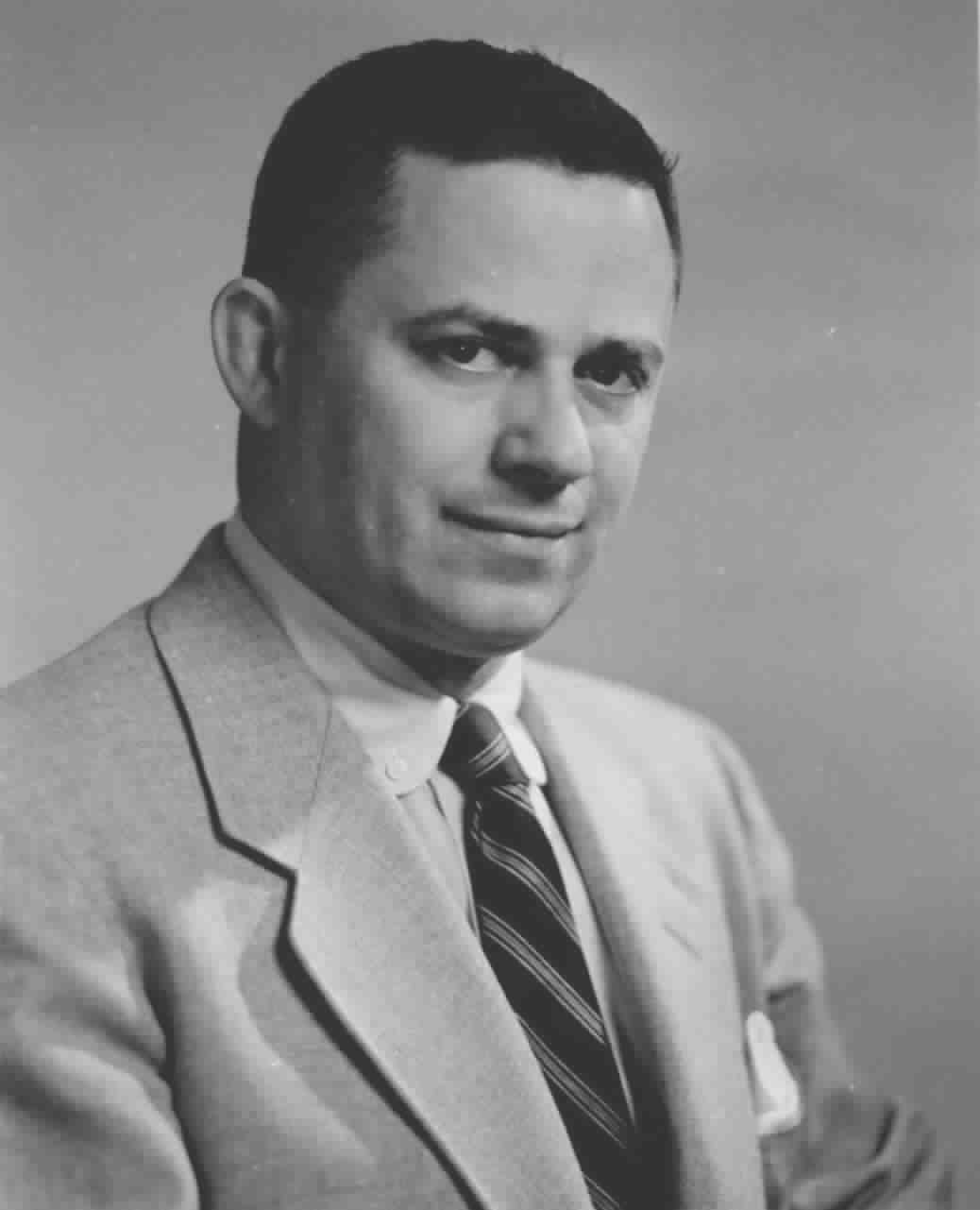

43rd Mayor of Baltimore
- In office December 6, 1962 – May 19, 1963
- Preceded by: J. Harold Grady
- Succeeded by: Theodore McKeldin

President of the Baltimore City Council
- In office 1961–1962

Member of the Maryland Senate
- In office 1955–1960

Member of the Baltimore City Council
- In office 1951–1954

Personal details
- Born: November 26, 1915 Kolk, Volhynia
- Died: May 1, 1976 (aged 60) Baltimore, Maryland, U.S.
- Resting place: Har Sinai Cemetery; Owings Mills, Maryland, U.S.
- Party: Democratic
- Profession: Politician; lawyer

Philip H. Goodman (November 26, 1915 – May 1, 1976) was an American politician, 43rd Mayor of the City of Baltimore and a member of the Maryland Senate. He was Jewish of Polish descent and is buried at Har Sinai Cemetery in Owings Mills.

Goodman was born in the shtetl of Kołki, then part of the Volhynian Governorate of the Russian Empire (now Kolky in the Volyn Oblast of Ukraine). His family moved to the United States when he was six.

== Education ==
Goodman grew up in Baltimore and attended the Baltimore City College high school. He earned his law degree from the University of Baltimore School of Law.

== See also ==
- List of mayors of the largest 50 US cities
