= Davis R. Ruark =

American lawyer

State's Attorney of Wicomico County
- In office February 1, 1987 – January 3, 2011
- Preceded by: Richard D. Warren
- Succeeded by: Matthew A. Maciarello

Personal details
- Born: 1955 (age 70–71) Salisbury, Maryland, U.S.
- Party: Democratic
- Education: Wake Forest University (BA); University of Baltimore School of Law (JD)
- Profession: Attorney

Davis R. Ruark (born 1955 in Salisbury, Maryland, U.S.) is an American lawyer. From February 1987 to January 2011 Ruark served as the State’s Attorney for Wicomico County, Maryland.

== Career ==
Currently, Ruark serves as an Assistant District Attorney in the 29th Prosecutorial District of North Carolina, having previously served as a Special District Attorney in the 12th and 13th Districts in North Carolina. Prior to the appointment in North Carolina, Ruark served as Deputy District Attorney in the Twelfth District Attorney’s Office in New Mexico. He also served as a Deputy District Attorney in New Mexico’s 3rd District, supervising all of the felony attorneys. Before starting in the 3rd District, Ruark served as a Chief Deputy District Attorney in the Eddy County/Carlsbad District Attorney's Office in the 5th Judicial District of New Mexico.

== Personal ==
Ruark is a member of the Maryland, North Carolina and New Mexico State Bars. He is also a member of the Bar of the Supreme Court of the United States. Ruark's father, Elmer F. Ruark, served as Mayor of Salisbury, Maryland, from 1974-1982.

== Career ==
Ruark was initially appointed State's Attorney for Wicomico County in February 1987. A member of the Democratic Party, he has been re-elected unopposed on five occasions. Ruark was defeated for re-election in a very low turnout Democratic primary election in September 2010. Matt Maciarello, a Republican, then won the general election to become the State's Attorney. Ruark remained in office until January 3, 2011.

As State's Attorney, Ruark personally prosecuted some high-profile cases, including death penalty cases. One example of a high-profile case, that he prosecuted, is the drunk driving case involving Michael Phelps, an Olympic gold medalist.

Ruark was sworn in as a Special Counsel for the State of Maryland and Special Assistant State's Attorney on January 3, 2011. Ruark assisted with the prosecution of Thomas Leggs, Jr., the person found guilty of murdering eleven-year-old Sarah Foxwell over Christmas 2009.

On March 12, 2012 Ruark was sworn in as a Senior Assistant District Attorney/Senior Trial Attorney in the 5th Judicial District in New Mexico. He then served as a Deputy and then Chief Deputy District Attorney in the 5th Judicial District Attorney's Office. Following his career there, Ruark became a Deputy District Attorney in the 3rd Judicial District Attorney's Office and then as a Deputy District Attorney in the 12th DA's Office. Following his move to North Carolina, Ruark was appointed an Assistant District Attorney in the 12th and 13th Prosecutorial Districts. Ruark was then hired as an Assistant District Attorney in the 29th District, which encompasses Moore County (Carthage, Pinehurst and Southern Pines) as well as Hoke County.

Ruark has always actively participated in athletics, including Wake Forest University. He also actively coached Minor League Little League Baseball through American Legion Baseball.

Ruark is a member of St. Luke United Methodist Church and in other community groups. He has been active in both Rotary and the Lions.

Ruark currently lives in the Raleigh, North Carolina metropolitan region.

== Arrest ==
In 2008, Ruark was arrested in Ocean City, Maryland for driving under the influence. Ruark pleaded guilty to driving under the influence and received one year unsupervised probation, a $500 fine, and 12 points on his driver's license.
