= LaVonda Reed =

- Born: January 20, 1969 (age 57)
- Occupations: Academic administrator, lawyer

Academic background
- Education: University of Virginia; University of Southern California

Academic work
- Discipline: U.S. law
- Sub-discipline: Wills and trusts, property, and communications regulatory law and policy
- Institutions: University of Louisville; Syracuse University; Georgia State University; University of Baltimore

LaVonda N. Reed (born January 20, 1969) is an American academic administrator and lawyer serving as dean of University of Baltimore School of Law since 2024. She was previously the seventh dean of the Georgia State University College of Law. She specializes in wills and trusts, property, and communications regulatory law and policy.

== Early life and career ==
Reed was born January 20, 1969. Her parents were raised in the segregated South and her father later became one of the first Black officers in the U.S. Marine Corps. As a result, she was a military brat who moved often, including living some time in Prince George's County, Maryland.

Reed earned a bachelor's degree in economics at the University of Virginia. Interested in social justice and U.S. history, she completed a J.D. at the University of Southern California Gould School of Law.

Reed was a judicial clerk for Donald West VanArtsdalen of the U.S. District Court for the Eastern District of Pennsylvania. She was later a telecommunications and corporate law attorney with Paul Hastings. Reed was became a faculty member at the University of Louisville School of Law.

In 2006, Reed joined faculty of Syracuse University College of Law where she was a law professor. Reed attended the first inauguration of Barack Obama after winning a ticket lottery set up by U.S. senator Chuck Schumer. Her areas of research include wills and trusts, property, and communications regulatory law and policy. By 2021, she was an associate provost for faculty affairs. In 2021, Reed was named the seventh dean of the Georgia State University College of Law. She is the first African American to serve in the role.

On July 1, 2024, she became dean of the University of Baltimore School of Law, the first woman to hold the position. In 2026, Reed and University of Maryland law dean Renée H. Laurent resigned from the Baltimore's Inspector General Advisory Board. In a joint letter to mayor Brandon Scott and city council president Zeke Cohen, they cited the limited need for their academic expertise and the demands of their other duties. In an earlier meeting, they had abstained when the board considered authorizing litigation by inspector general Isabel Mercedes Cumming.

== Personal life ==
In 2009, Reed and her husband, reverend Franklin Huff had a three-year-old daughter.
