= Thomas D'Alesandro III =

American politician (1929–2019)

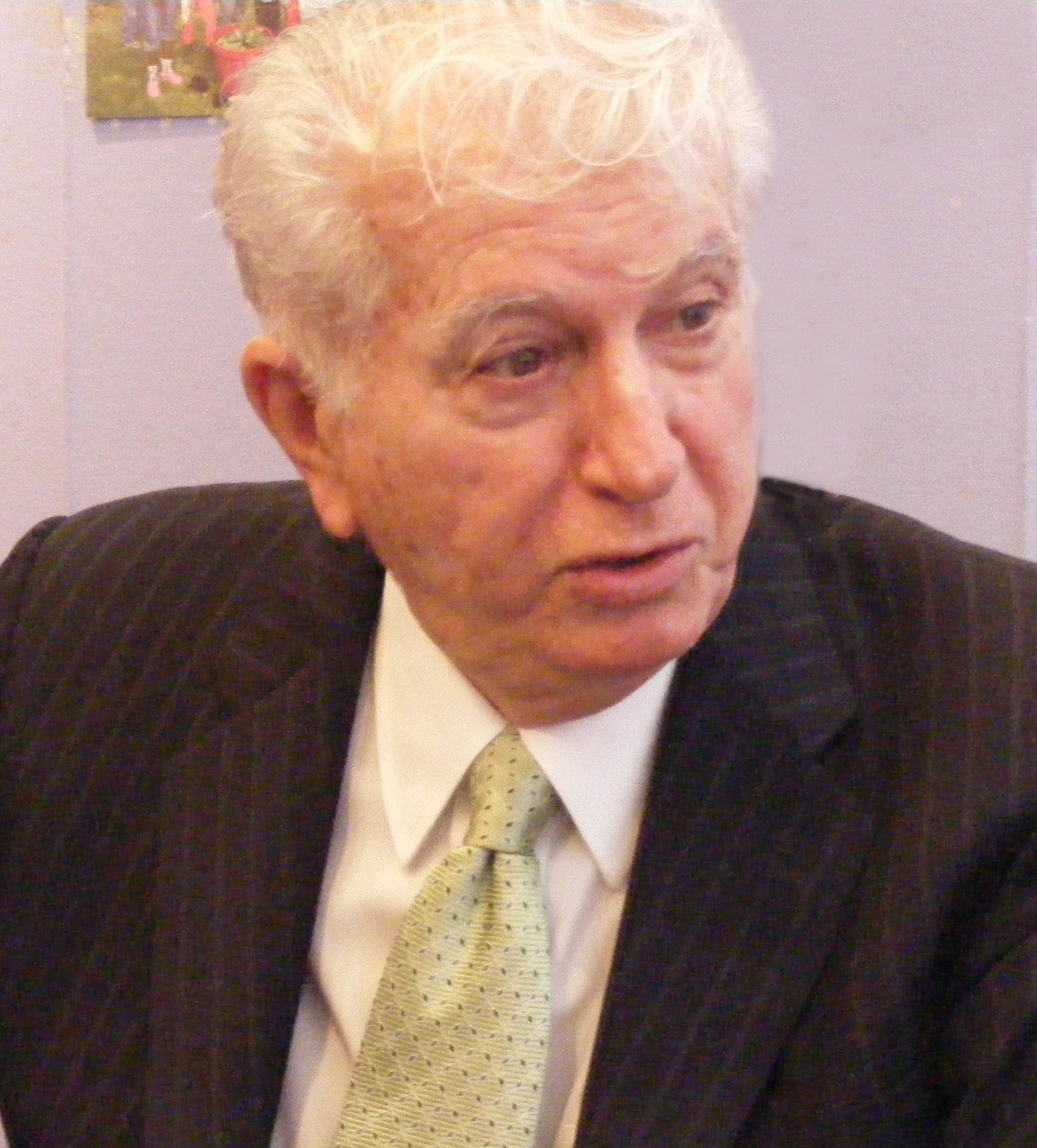
- D'Alesandro in 2011

44th Mayor of Baltimore
- In office December 1967 – December 1971
- Preceded by: Theodore McKeldin
- Succeeded by: William Donald Schaefer

Personal details
- Born: Thomas Ludwig John D'Alesandro III; July 24, 1929 Baltimore, Maryland, U.S.
- Died: October 20, 2019 (aged 90) Baltimore, Maryland, U.S.
- Party: Democratic
- Spouse: Margie Piracci (m. 1952)
- Children: 5
- Parent: Thomas D'Alesandro Jr. (father)
- Relatives: Nancy Pelosi (sister); Paul Pelosi (brother-in-law)
- Education: Loyola University Maryland (BA); University of Maryland, Baltimore (LLB)

Military service
- Allegiance: United States
- Branch/service: United States Army
- Years of service: 1952–1955

Thomas Ludwig John D'Alesandro III (July 24, 1929 – October 20, 2019) was an American attorney and politician who served as the 44th mayor of Baltimore from 1967 to 1971. A member of the Democratic Party, he was the president of the Baltimore City Council from 1962 to 1967. During his tenure as mayor, the Baltimore riot of 1968 occurred. He was the eldest son of Thomas D'Alesandro Jr., the 41st mayor of Baltimore; and brother of Nancy Pelosi, the 52nd speaker of the U.S. House of Representatives.

== Early life ==
D'Alesandro was born in Baltimore, to Annunciata (née Lombardi) and Thomas J. D'Alesandro Jr. He was the oldest of six children, of whom his youngest sister Nancy Pelosi would later become prominent in her own right. He attended Loyola College in Baltimore and studied law at the University of Maryland School of Law.

In 1952, he married Margaret "Margie" Piracci at the Baltimore Basilica; more than 5,000 people attended the wedding. He served in the United States Army from 1952 to 1955.

== Political career ==
After military service, D'Alesandro entered into politics, becoming president of the Baltimore City Council in 1963. As City Council president, he worked with Mayor Theodore McKeldin, a liberal Republican, to eliminate racial barriers in employment, education and other areas.

=== Mayor of Baltimore ===
D'Alesandro ran for mayor in 1967 as a Democrat and easily defeated Republican challenger Arthur W. Sherwood, winning all 555 of the city's precincts.

As Baltimore's 44th mayor, he opened new schools, built a new police headquarters and pushed for open housing. D'Alesandro got Baltimoreans to approve an $80 million bond issue to build schools. He devised summer recreation programs for the city's youth, such as mobile pools and day camps, and also laid legislative groundwork for the Inner Harbor development.

D'Alesandro's term as mayor was dominated by civil unrest and budgetary troubles. In 1968, D'Alesandro ordered the relocation of the East-West Expressway, unstarted since 1941, to be rerouted through the Western Cemetery, then cancelled the project. He later implemented a HUD program to finance 475 of the vacant homes abandoned after they were previously condemned to create "homes for the poor". The homes were demolished in 1974, with The Rouse Company creditors abandoning the project.

In the late 1960s and early 1970s, Federal agencies proposed multi-lane expressways severely that would impact the Federal Hill neighborhood, and drastically impacted Baltimore's character. As Federal Hill had been newly elevated to the National Register of Historic Places, a Section 106 Review was invoked requiring the federal agency (i.e., the Department of Transportation) to assess the effect of its actions on historic resources: "a compromise was suggested by the mayor [D'Alesandro]; the Federal Hill community was to be actively involved in developing a highway plan that would reflect its concern for the preservation of the historic area. Community meetings were organized to help people to understand the many problems that had resulted from years of mistrust and indecision. A survey of the area was then conducted. This survey proved useful in clarifying the goals of historic preservation so that plans could be developed for an alignment that would meet those goals." Ultimately, the activism resulted in considerable downsizing of the Key Highway at Federal Hill from 14 lanes to Four, averting tunnels under Federal Hill Park. A pocket park was proposed as a buffer, today's Robert Baker Park, as a lasting reminder of Mayor D'Alesandro's significant and successful effort to mediate between Federal transportation forces and local advocacy on behalf of the community.

Just four months after D'Alesandro's inauguration, the Baltimore riot of 1968 erupted after the assassination of Martin Luther King Jr., and Maryland Governor Spiro Agnew called National Guard troops in to control the situation.

D'Alesandro, who took office vowing to "root out every cause or vestige of discrimination", remained proud throughout his life of his progressive record on civil rights. As mayor, he appointed multiple African-Americans to his administration, some of them, such as George Russell Jr., the city solicitor and member of the Board of Estimates, the first African Americans to hold those positions.

In 1971, D'Alesandro stepped down as mayor and retired from politics and went into private law practice. Years later, D'Alesandro insisted that the riots were not the reason that he walked away from politics. He said that the reason was simply that he had five children and his mayoral salary was not sufficient for him to support his family.

In 1998, Jack Eddinger, D'Alesandro's former press secretary, wrote in The Baltimore Sun that "Tommy D'Alesandro was Baltimore's first modern mayor. He not only presided over its emergence as a Renaissance City that it is today, but he gave it unmatched leadership. Much of what other mayors get credit for began in those tumultuous four years, from urban design and labor law reform to streamlined governmental administration and the flowering of the vital alliance between the city and the Greater Baltimore Committee".

== Death ==
D'Alesandro died after complications from a stroke at his home in North Baltimore on October 20, 2019, at the age of 90.

His sister, Nancy Pelosi said upon his death:

Tommy dedicated his life to our city. A champion of civil rights, he worked tirelessly for all who called Baltimore home. Tommy was a leader of dignity, compassion and extraordinary courage, whose presence radiated hope upon our city during times of struggle and conflict.

At a CNN Town Hall in December 2019, Pelosi also noted that "his vision was to say that I want to rid our society of every vestige of discrimination and that was his call to action."

Political offices
Preceded by Theodore McKeldin	Mayor of Baltimore; 1967–1971	Succeeded by William Schaefer
