= William Preston Lane Jr. =

American politician (1892–1967)

William Lane
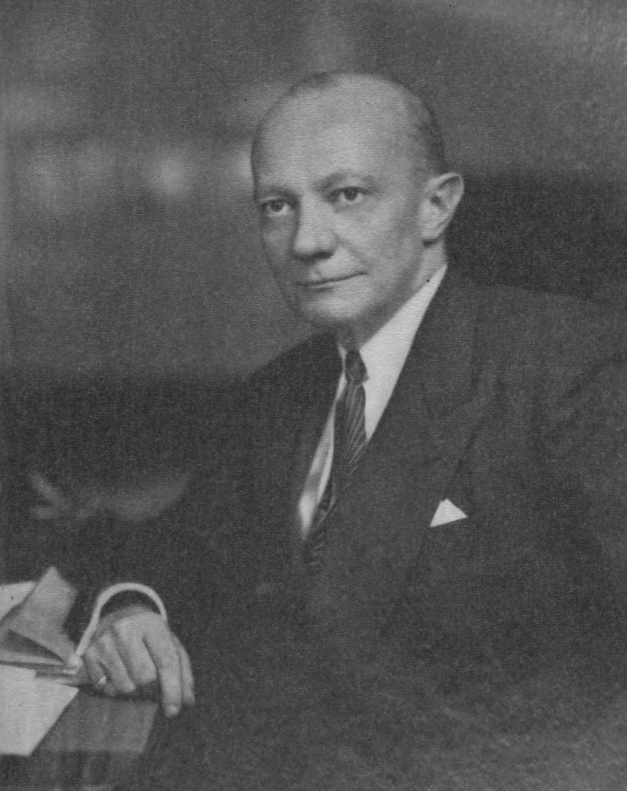
- Lane in 1950

Chair of the National Governors Association
- In office January 3, 1949 – June 19, 1949
- Preceded by: Lester C. Hunt
- Succeeded by: Frank Carlson

52nd Governor of Maryland
- In office January 3, 1947 – January 10, 1951
- Preceded by: Herbert O'Conor
- Succeeded by: Theodore McKeldin

Attorney General of Maryland
- In office 1931–1935
- Governor: Albert Ritchie
- Preceded by: Thomas H. Robinson
- Succeeded by: Herbert O'Conor

Personal details
- Born: William Preston Lane Jr. May 12, 1892 Hagerstown, Maryland, U.S.
- Died: February 7, 1967 (aged 74) Hagerstown, Maryland, U.S.
- Resting place: Rose Hill Cemetery; Hagerstown, Maryland
- Party: Democratic
- Spouse: Dorothy Byron
- Children: 2
- Education: University of Virginia (LLB)

Military service
- Allegiance: United States
- Branch/service: United States Army
- Rank: Major
- Unit: 115th Infantry Regiment; 29th Infantry Division
- Awards: Silver Star

William Preston Lane Jr. (May 12, 1892 – February 7, 1967) was an American attorney and politician who served as the 52nd governor of Maryland from 1947 to 1951.

== Early life and education ==
Lane was born in Hagerstown, Maryland, on May 12, 1892, to William Preston Lane and Virginia Cartwright Lane. He attended public school in Hagerstown before graduating from the University of Virginia in 1915 with a law degree. He subsequently joined the law firm Lane, Bushong, and Byron in his hometown, where he also served on the vestry of Saint John's Church. Lane served during the Mexican Border Campaign (1916) as a captain in the Maryland National Guard.

His father, William Preston "Bunch" Lane, Sr., played for Princeton in the first ever college football game, and was the last living member of the Princeton team.

== Military service ==
When the United States entered World War I in 1917, Lane joined the 115th Infantry Regiment as a captain and served in France during the Meuse-Argonne Offensive. He was awarded the Silver Star for his actions at Bois-des-Consevoye, where he assisted in the evacuation of wounded after a bridge was destroyed by enemy fire. He continued service in the military after the war as Assistant Division Adjutant of the 29th Division at the rank of major.

== Career ==
Upon his return from service, Lane resumed the practice of law and began testing a career in politics. He ran for but lost the seat of Washington County State's Attorney in 1919. After his defeat, he served as the president of a small newspaper company, as president of a tannery, and as a railroad executive. He married Dorothy Byron on January 17, 1922, and had two daughters, Dorothy and Jean.

=== Attorney General of Maryland ===
In 1928, Lane returned to politics when he was elected to the school board of Washington County. In 1930, the Democratic candidate for Attorney General of Maryland died unexpectedly and a replacement had to be found. Since Lane had formed a friendship with Albert Ritchie, the Governor of Maryland, he was placed on the ticket and won the seat by a large margin over his Republican opponent.

The highlight of Lane's career as Attorney General was his pursuit of a lynching prosecution on the Eastern Shore of Maryland in 1933. Two years earlier on the Shore, a notorious lynching had occurred in Salisbury (the lynching of Matthew Williams), the response to which by Attorney-General Lane and Governor Ritchie was heavily criticized. Subsequently, another black man, George Armwood, was arrested and charged with raping a white woman in the adjoining Somerset County and was being held prisoner by police in Princess Anne. However, a mob overran the police and kidnapped Armwood, badly beating, stabbing and mutilating him before the hanging, then burning his body in front of the nearby courthouse. Local police did not pursue prosecution of the lynch mob, but Lane took charge of the investigation. The Maryland State Police and militia were called out by Governor Ritchie to assist, which resulted in further mob violence and arrests on the Eastern Shore, which damaged Lane's reputation.

As Attorney General, Lane also pleaded two cases before the United States Supreme Court involving the assessment of submerged lands and the state's right to tax condemned federal lands. Lane chose not to seek re-election in 1934.

After his tenure as Attorney General, Lane remained very active in state and national politics. From 1940 to 1950, he served as a member of the Democratic National Committee from Maryland, and he was a delegate to the Democratic National Convention from 1928 to 1948. In 1944, Lane managed Franklin Roosevelt's Maryland campaign for re-election as President of the United States. Lane also remained active in business, serving as president of an aircraft corporation and a bridge company. He also kept active in law as a member of the firm Lane and Mish.

=== Governor of Maryland ===
In 1946, Lane decided to run for governor. In the Democratic primary election, he defeated challengers J. Millard Tawes and H. Streett Baldwin, and then defeated Republican Theodore R. McKeldin in the general election 55%-45%. As governor, Lane and his administration worked towards improving the public education, mental health, and highway systems of the state. A newspaper report published in 1949 exposed serious flaws in the treatment of the mentally ill in the state, which resulted in the creation of the Department of Mental Hygiene and turned Maryland's mental hospitals by the end of the Lane administration into some of the best in the nation. Major highway improvements which had been deferred by World War II were also put in motion by Lane, which were funded by the enactment in 1947 of Maryland's first state sales tax. The Chesapeake Bay Bridge, which now carries his name, was completed in 1952 under this plan. Several historic state facilities were also renovated during Lane's tenure, including the Maryland State House which had not been adequately preserved since its construction in 1772.

Lane faced George P. Mahoney, a perennial candidate, in the 1950 Democratic primary election held on September 18, 1950. The primary was close and bruising, and left the Lane campaign weakened for the general election against Theodore McKeldin, his opponent in the 1946 election. Additionally, his unpopular sales tax to fund road improvements had caused significant dissent in the state and was used by McKeldin to pull votes away from Lane. On November 7, 1950, Lane was defeated in the general election by 94,000 votes, 57%-43%. At that point, it was the largest margin of defeat in Maryland history. Lane's term as governor ended on January 10, 1951.

After his term as governor, Lane remained active in the Democratic party and engaged in business pursuits. He died of a heart attack in 1967, and is buried in Rose Hill Cemetery in Hagerstown.

== Legacy ==
- William Preston Lane Jr. Memorial Bridge (more commonly known as the Chesapeake Bay Bridge).
- Lane Building (demolished in 2006) on the campus of Springfield State Hospital Center, Sykesville, Maryland.

Legal offices
Preceded by Thomas H. Robinson	Attorney General of Maryland; 1931–1935	Succeeded by Herbert O'Conor
Political offices
Preceded by Herbert O'Conor	Governor of Maryland; 1947–1951	Succeeded by Theodore McKeldin
Preceded by Lester C. Hunt	Chair of the National Governors Association; 1949	Succeeded by Frank Carlson
Party political offices
Preceded by Herbert O'Conor	Democratic nominee for Governor of Maryland; 1946, 1950	Succeeded by Curley Byrd
