= J. Harold Grady =

American judge

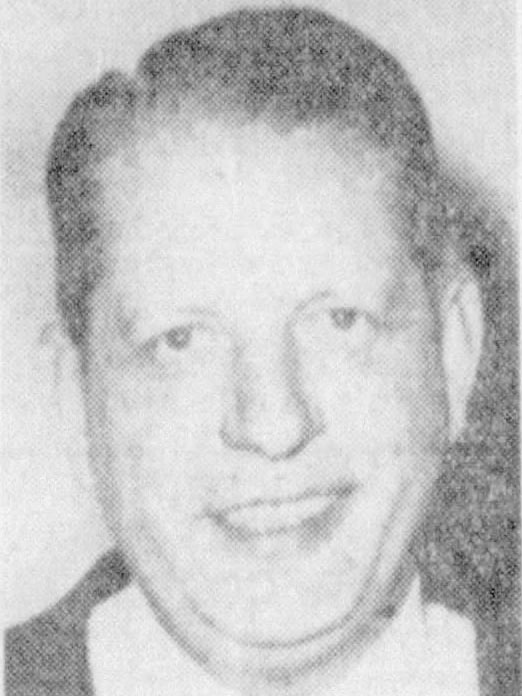

Maryland State Court Judge
- In office 1962–1984

42nd Mayor of Baltimore
- In office 1959–1962

Personal details
- Born: February 27, 1917 Williamsport, Lycoming County, Pennsylvania
- Died: January 9, 2002 (aged 84)
- Party: Democratic

Joseph Harold Grady (February 27, 1917 – January 9, 2002) was a judge and the mayor of Baltimore, Maryland from 1959 to 1962.

Prior to running for mayor, he was an FBI agent and State's Attorney of Baltimore City.

Preceded by Thomas L. J. D'Alesandro Jr.	Mayor of Baltimore; 1959–1962	Succeeded by Philip H. Goodman
