= Theodore McKeldin =

53rd governor of Maryland (1900-1974)

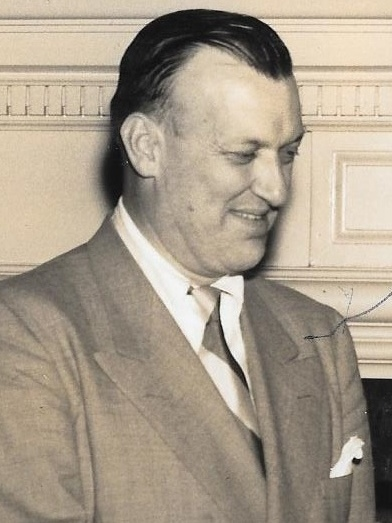
- McKeldin in 1951

53rd Governor of Maryland
- In office January 10, 1951 – January 14, 1959
- Preceded by: William Preston Lane Jr.
- Succeeded by: J. Millard Tawes

40th Mayor of Baltimore
- In office May 19, 1963 – December 1967
- Preceded by: Philip H. Goodman
- Succeeded by: Thomas D'Alesandro III
- In office May 16, 1943 – May 16, 1947
- Preceded by: Howard W. Jackson
- Succeeded by: Thomas D'Alesandro Jr.

Personal details
- Born: Theodore Roosevelt McKeldin; November 20, 1900 Baltimore, Maryland, U.S.
- Died: August 10, 1974 (aged 73) Baltimore, Maryland, U.S.
- Resting place: Green Mount Cemetery
- Party: Republican
- Spouse: Honolulu Manzer
- Children: 2
- Education: University of Maryland, Baltimore (LLB)

Theodore Roosevelt McKeldin (November 20, 1900 – August 10, 1974) was an American politician. A member of the Republican Party, McKeldin served as mayor of Baltimore twice, from 1943 to 1947 and again from 1963 to 1967, and as governor of Maryland from 1951 to 1959.

== Early life ==
McKeldin was born in Baltimore as one of 11 children. His father had worked as a stonecutter and later was a Baltimore City police officer. McKeldin attended high school at Baltimore City College in the evenings while working as a bank clerk during the day. He later graduated from the University of Maryland Francis King Carey School of Law at the University of Maryland, Baltimore, and was admitted to the Maryland bar.

Two years later, he began his political ascent as a secretary to Mayor William Frederick Broening, one of the few Republican mayors of the predominantly Democratic city. McKeldin also served as vice president of the local chapter of the United States Junior Chamber. In 1934, he co-founded the charity Santa Claus Anonymous.

== Political career ==
McKeldin challenged Democratic mayor of Baltimore Howard W. Jackson in the 1939 election, but was defeated. He subsequently challenged the incumbent governor of Maryland, Democrat Herbert R. O'Conor, in 1942, but lost by five points.

McKeldin would ultimately be elected mayor of Baltimore in 1943 on his second attempt. During his first term, he oversaw the construction of Friendship Airport, now Baltimore/Washington International Airport, in Anne Arundel County. McKeldin ran for governor again in 1946, challenging William Preston Lane Jr., but was defeated again, by a wider margin than in 1942.

He ran for governor a third time in 1950, defeating Lane in a rematch. As governor, McKeldin endeavored to improve the state highway system by establishing the Baltimore Beltway (now Interstate 695), the Capital Beltway (Interstate 495), and the John Hanson Highway portion of U.S. Route 50. He was a staunch supporter of interstate cooperation, saying once: "I rode by train over several state borders. I carried no passports. No one asked me to identify myself. No one had the right to. This is America." He was also an advocate for civil rights for African Americans, and received the Sidney Hollander Award for his pro-civil rights efforts. He was also a supporter of Israel.

In 1952, McKeldin was a major figure among moderate Republicans who campaigned for Dwight D. Eisenhower to receive the Republican nomination for President, and would deliver the principal nominating speech for Eisenhower at the 1952 Republican National Convention in Chicago.

In 1954, McKeldin was re-elected governor against the president of the University of Maryland, College Park, Curley Byrd, who had controversially resisted desegregating the university. After his second term in Government House, McKeldin returned to his law practice in Baltimore; he was succeeded as Governor by Democrat J. Millard Tawes.

McKeldin calls Philip H. Goodman over the telephone after winning the 1963 Baltimore mayoral election, along with him is the comptroller elected Hyman A. Pressman.

In 1963, McKeldin returned to public service after being narrowly elected to a second non-consecutive term as mayor of Baltimore. In his second term, his administration focused on the urban renewal of the city's Inner Harbor. In 1964, he decided to support Democratic candidate Lyndon B. Johnson over Republican Barry M. Goldwater in the presidential election, due to Goldwater's opposition to the Civil Rights Act of 1964. In 1966, the city council voted to condemn and demolish 700 homes in the Rosemont neighborhood to build the Interstate 170 "highway to nowhere" that McKeldin had conceived with urban planner Robert Moses in 1941. McKeldin's second term as mayor ended in 1967, and he did not seek re-election.

== Personal life ==
McKeldin married Honolulu Claire Manzer on October 17, 1924. They had two children.

== Death ==
McKeldin died on August 10, 1974, and is buried in Green Mount Cemetery in Baltimore.

== Dedications ==
- McKeldin Center at Morgan State University
- McKeldin Library and McKeldin Mall at the University of Maryland, College Park
- Theodore McKeldin Gymnasium at Bowie State University
- McKeldin Building at Springfield Hospital Center
- McKeldin Beltway (Interstate 695)
- McKeldin Area, Patapsco Valley State Park
- McKeldin Planetarium at St. John's College

Political offices
| Preceded by Howard W. Jackson | Mayor of Baltimore; 1943–1947 | Succeeded by Thomas D'Alesandro Jr. |
| Preceded by William Preston Lane Jr. | Governor of Maryland; 1951–1959 | Succeeded by J. Millard Tawes |
| Preceded by Philip H. Goodman | Mayor of Baltimore; 1963–1967 | Succeeded by Thomas D'Alesandro III |
Party political offices
| Preceded by Harry Nice | Republican nominee for Governor of Maryland; 1942, 1946, 1950, 1954 | Succeeded by James Devereux |
