= Public Safety Building =

Public Safety Building may refer to:

- Public Safety Building (Cumberland, Maryland)
- Public Safety Building (Winnipeg)
- Public Safety Building (Montgomery)
