= List of United States federal courthouses in Maryland =

Following is a list of current and former courthouses of the United States federal court system located in Maryland. Each entry indicates the name of the building along with an image, if available, its location and the jurisdiction it covers, the dates during which it was used for each such jurisdiction, and, if applicable the person for whom it was named, and the date of renaming. Dates of use will not necessarily correspond with the dates of construction or demolition of a building, as pre-existing structures may be adapted or court use, and former court buildings may later be put to other uses. Also, the official name of the building may be changed at some point after its use as a federal court building has been initiated.

The district court met in the Maryland State House, in Annapolis, for the first decade of its existence. In 1800, judge Samuel Chase tried a local postmaster for embezzlement and sentenced him to thirty-nine lashes. In order to carry out the sentence, the defendant was tied to one of the statehouse columns.

== Courthouses ==
Courthouse	City	Image	Street address	Jurisdiction	Dates of use	Named for
U.S. Courthouse (Masonic Hall)	Baltimore		St. Paul Street and Courthouse Lane	D. Md.	1822–1864; Razed in 1895	n/a
U.S. Courthouse	Baltimore		North St. and Fayette St.	D. Md.	1865–c. 1890; Razed in 1930	n/a
U.S. Post Office & Courthouse	Baltimore		101–125 Calvert St.	D. Md.	1890–1930; Razed in 1930.	n/a
U.S. Post Office & Courthouse	Baltimore		111 N. Calvert Street	D. Md.	1932–1976; Now in use by the Baltimore city courts and known as Courthouse East.	n/a
Edward A. Garmatz U.S. Court House	Baltimore		101 West Lombard Street	D. Md.	1976–present	Edward Garmatz
U.S. Courthouse and Post Office†	Cumberland		Frederick Street	D. Md.	1904–1933; Now in use by the city and known as the Public Safety Building.	n/a
U.S. Post Office & Courthouse now the William Donald Schaefer Building	Cumberland		3 Pershing Street	D. Md.	1933–? Now in use by the Maryland state courts.	Governor William Donald Schaefer
U.S. Courthouse	Greenbelt		6500 Cherrywood Lane	D. Md.	1994–present	n/a
Maude R. Toulson Federal Building†	Salisbury		129 East Main Street	D. Md.	?–present	Maude R. Toulson

== Key ==
^{†}	Listed on the National Register of Historic Places (NRHP)
^{††}	NRHP-listed and also designated as a National Historic Landmark

== See also ==
- Merchants' Exchange Building (Baltimore, Maryland)
- United States Custom House (Baltimore)
- List of United States federal courthouses
