= Ford's Grand Opera House =

Theatre in Baltimore (1929-1964)

Coordinates: 39°17′26″N 76°37′14″W

Ford's Grand Opera House was a major music venue in Baltimore, Maryland, located on West Fayette Street between North Howard and Eutaw Streets. It was founded by theatre manager John T. Ford (also the owner of infamous Ford's Theatre in Washington, D.C. where President Abraham Lincoln was assassinated, April 14, 1865) and designed by architect James J. Gifford. The opera house/theatre opened to the public on October 2, 1871, with a show that included readings from Shakespeare's "As You Like It" as well as vocal and orchestral performances. Then owned by 1950s–60s era theatre magnate Morris A. Mechanic, it closed almost 93 years later with its last Broadway show, A Funny Thing Happened on the Way to the Forum in 1964. It was replaced three years later as the prime site for Baltimore live theatre patrons with the opening in the landmark of the new downtown redevelopment project of Charles Center, the starkly modernistic "Brutalist" architecture of the Morris A. Mechanic Theatre at the southwest corner of Charles and Baltimore Streets, four blocks to the east.

The Ford Opera house was later the site of newspaper publisher of the New York Tribune, Horace Greeley's nomination as the Liberal Republican Party candidate from a split Republican Party for the 1872 American Presidential election versus regular Republican Party candidate, incumbent 18th President, Ulysses S. Grant and Democratic candidate Seymour, who was reelected.

== Protests (1946-1952) ==
The allure of the theatre attracted many kinds of people. Starting in 1946, Civil Rights activists in Baltimore such as Adah Jenkins began to picket the Ford's Grand Opera House. This demonstration was a direct result of the Jim Crow policies at the time, which led to segregation in seating, accommodation, and ticket availability for people of colored skin. The Ford Theatre gave specific seating to African-Americans, often in the third row of the theatre. During this period, Civil Rights activists were able to make an impact on the segregation policies of Baltimore's theatres to the point where it was recognized by the NAACP.

After six years of protesting, Ford's Opera House desegregated in 1952. Fords theatre had been operating under segregation since its opening in 1871. After multiple appeals to actors and other influential people in the community, officials in charge of the theatre agreed on the desegregation of the theatre, saying that it would add to the welfare of colored people and help aid in the betterment of race relations. To help end segregation in Ford's theatre, protestors enlisted the help of the NAACP, playwrights, actors, and more which proved to be very effective in bringing awareness to the community. Even Government officials found themselves speaking out against the segregation of Ford's theatre such as Governor McKeldin, when he called the segregation, offensive, illogical, and absurd.
