= Paterakis =

Paterakis is a surname. Notable people with the surname include:

- John Paterakis (1929–2016), American businessman
- Manolis Paterakis (fl. 1939-1945), Greek resistance member from Crete during World War II
