= Charles Center =

Charles Center City Center
- Neighborhood of Baltimore
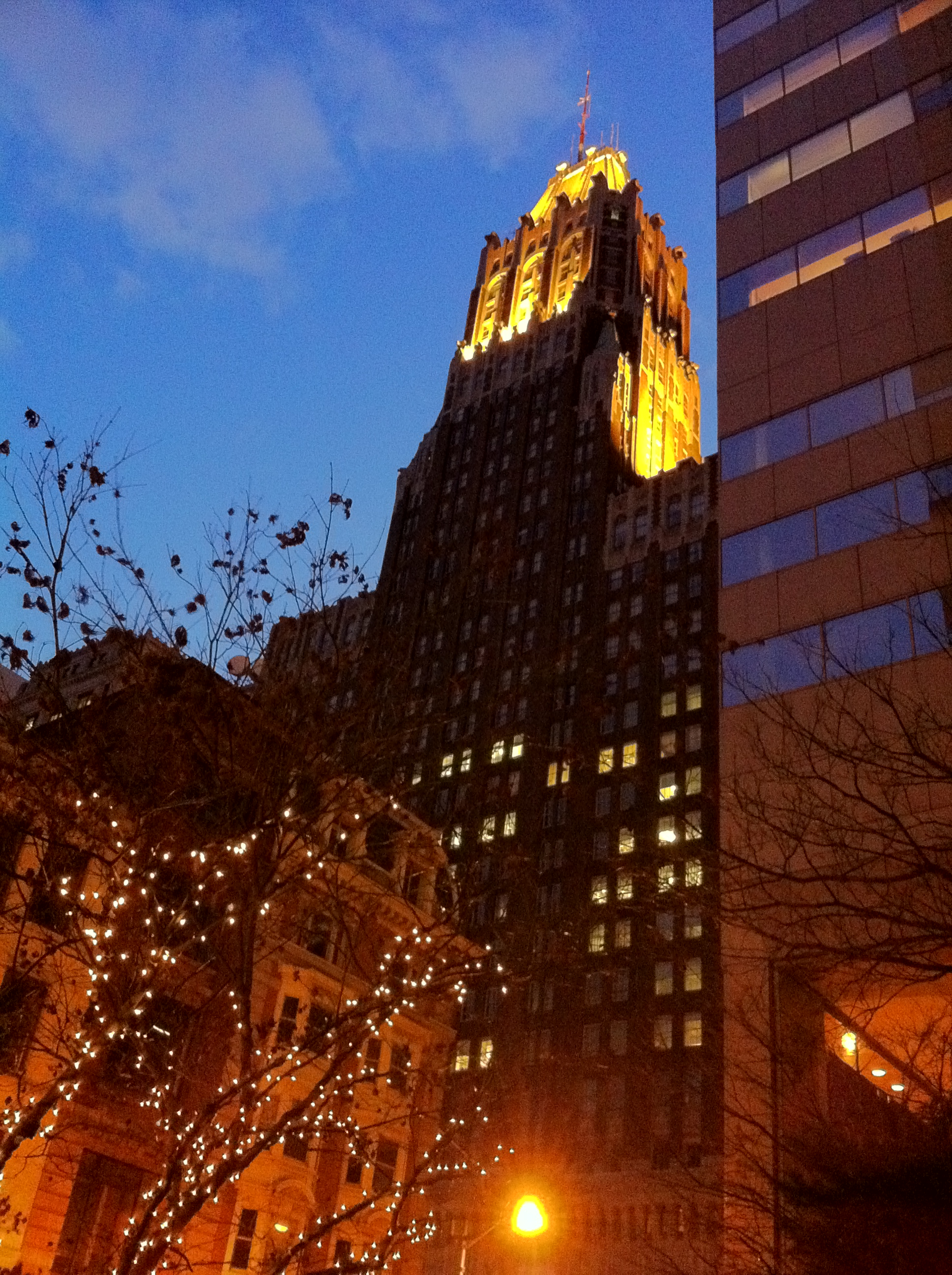
- Looking up from the Charles Center subway station.
- Country: United States
- State: Maryland
- City: Baltimore
- District: Central

Charles Center is a large-scale urban redevelopment project in central Baltimore's downtown business district of the late 1950s and early 1960s.

== History ==
Beginning in 1954, a group called the "Committee for Downtown" promoted a master plan for arresting the commercial decline of central Baltimore. In 1955, the "Greater Baltimore Committee", headed by banker and developer James W. Rouse, joined the effort. A plan was developed by noted American urban planner and architect David A. Wallace, (1917−2004), strongly supported by Mayors Thomas L. J. D'Alesandro, Jr. (1947−1959) and Theodore R. McKeldin, (1943−1947 and 1963−1967) and many in their administrations, which formed the basis of a $25 million bond issue voted on by the citizens of Baltimore City during the municipal elections in November 1958. The architects' view of the overall Charles Center Redevelopment Plan with the conceptions of possible buildings, lay-out and plan that was publicized to the voters that spring and summer before, only slightly resembles the actual buildings and designs that later were really constructed by the mid-1970s.

The plan was unusual for its time in not pursuing a "clean-slate" site, but rather incorporating existing structures. The 33 acres (13 ha) site includes three public plazas, (Charles, Center, and Hopkins) designed by RTKL, connected by walkways, staircases and pedestrian bridges. The plazas cover several multi-level underground parking garages known originally as "Down Under". In the late 1970s Rouse's Inner Harbor project extended the redevelopment southward to Baltimore Harbor and the northern shore of the Northwest Branch of the Patapsco River and was even later in the late 1980s to include the Pratt Street Power Plant on Pier 4 along East Pratt Street and moving north up into Market Place (site of former "Centre Market" with its three adjacent wholesale produce, fish and retail/dry goods market buildings) along the west bank of the Jones Falls stream, with a development with two different phases/developers as "The Brokerage" and later renamed "Power Plant Live!" .

By the late 1990s, development, new skyscrapers and attractions had moved further east and southeast along the Patapsco River/Baltimore Harbor waterfront into an industrial/warehousing/manufacturing area originally termed "Inner Harbor East", later shortened to "Harbor East", spearheaded by John Paterakis of the H & S Bakery Company on near-by South Central Avenue and Aliceanna and Fleet Streets and his developer/assistant Michael Beatty, eventually moving up against the western fringes of the simultaneous eastward growth from the other direction along the waterfront from Canton and Fells Point. By 2013, "Harbor East" boasted an extension southeastward from the southern end of the Jones Falls Expressway − (Interstate 83) of old alley-like President Street south to become a wide, tree-lined boulevard ending in a central circle with a sculpture and monument with a stepped water fall at the base commemorating the Katryn Forest Massacre of 1939−40 by Soviet Red Army of captured Polish Army officers at the beginning of World War II, a memorial project of the Polish-American community in East Baltimore. Surrounding the impressive but sober sculpture is an array of shiny new glass and steel modernist hotels, office buildings with ground-level stores, shops, markets and a movie theatre, even with a restored "President Street Station" from 1849 to 1850 of the Philadelphia, Wilmington and Baltimore Railroad with exhibits and activities for a "Baltimore Civil War Museum" commemorating the Station's railroad history as the oldest big-city train station left, an architectural landmark for its unique "Howe truss" type roof structure, and commemorating the "First Bloodshed of the Civil War" on Friday, April 19, 1861, with the occurrence of the famed "Pratt Street Riot" which took place all along President Street north to turn west on Pratt Street to the Camden Street Station (restored today with museums and exhibits inside for sports, entertainment and its Civil War, labor and railroad history) of the Baltimore and Ohio Railroad near the present Camden Yards stadiums with near-by "Oriole Park" for the baseball team Baltimore Orioles.

The Charles Center public areas underwent extensive renovations in the early 2010s to improve its competitiveness with newer developments, including those at the Inner Harbor (from the late 1960s to the early 1980s). A tree-lined plaza, water fountain feature, gardens, outdoor seating and green space was improved and/or added within the Charles Center Plaza, providing nearby office workers, tourists and nearby residents with an outdoor space.

== Buildings constructed ==
- One Charles Center, North Charles and West Fayette Streets, 1962, a 24-story office tower designed by Ludwig Mies van der Rohe
- Two Charles Center, West Saratoga, North Charles and North Liberty Streets, 1969, a pair of residential towers, 27 and 30 stories
- George H. Fallon Federal Office Building, north side facing Hopkins Plaza, (rear/south side on West Lombard Street), 1964?
- Mercantile Safe Deposit and Trust Company Building, West Baltimore Street and Hopkins Place/South Liberty Street, (rear/south side facing Hopkins Plaza), 1969
- The Statler Hilton Baltimore, North Hanover and West Fayette Streets, a hotel covering an entire city block, designed by William B. Tabler, with two towers, one opened in 1967, the second in 1974. In 2023, the property was converted to and re-opened as apartments by the residential development corp Vivo Living.
- Morris A. Mechanic Theatre, North Charles and West Baltimore Streets, 1967 | Demolished 2014, pending redevelopment
- Sun Life Building (Baltimore), North Charles Street, 1966
- Charles Center South, South Charles and West Lombard Streets, 1975
- Edward A. Garmatz United States Courthouse, West Lombard Street and South Hanover Street, 1976

== Buildings retained or preserved ==
- Maryland National Bank Building, (originally the Baltimore Trust Building when built, later the Mathieson Building, Maryland National Bank Building, briefly NCNB-NationsBank Tower), 10 Light Street, between East Baltimore and East Redwood Streets and Wine Alley, 1929, (later in 2012, acquired by Bank of America
- Fidelity and Deposit Trust Company Building, North Charles and West Lexington Streets, 1894
- Baltimore and Ohio Railroad Company Building, North Charles and West Baltimore Streets, 1906?
- Lord Baltimore Hotel (now in Radisson Plaza Suites hotel chain), West Baltimore Street, at North Hanover Street, 1928,
- Baltimore Gas and Electric Company Building, West Lexington and North Liberty Streets, 1916, (now the 39 West Lexington Homes (apartments/condos), 21 stories; also with Annex Tower adjacent, built 196?, still used as offices by BGE (later part of Constellation Energy Group, acquired by Exelon Corporation of Chicago, 2013
