= Arnold M. Weiner =

American lawyer

Arnold M. Weiner is an American lawyer in Maryland with the law firm of Rifkin Weiner Livingston LLC . He also represented former Baltimore Mayor Sheila Dixon, former Maryland Governor Marvin Mandel and former United States Representative Edward Garmatz. He also represented a witness who offered evidence in the case against former Vice-president Spiro Agnew.

After graduating from the University of Maryland Law School in 1957, Weiner clerked for Simon E. Sobeloff. He then worked as an assistant United States Attorney. After leaving the federal prosecutor's office, Weiner worked as a criminal defense attorney, before turning to civil litigation.

One of his largest civil cases was Devan v. Ernst and Young, which settled for a near-record $185 million. In Devan v. Ernst and Young, Deborah H. Devan, the Chapter 7 Trustee for Merry-Go-Round Enterprises, alleged the accounting firm engaged in duplicity and provided bad advice while providing turnaround accounting services. The lawsuit accused Ernst and Young of concealing its relationship with Washington D.C. law firm Swidler & Berlin, which had recommended Ernst and Young as the turnaround adviser. Swidler & Berlin represented the accounting firm in a West Virginia lawsuit at the time. The assertion was also made that E&Y assigned junior personnel who gave incompetent advice. At the time of the settlement, experts believed it to be the first case to assign liability to a consultant hired to manage the turnaround of a bankrupt company. After settling that case, E&Y hired Weiner and his partners to represent E&Y in its suit against Swidler & Berlin.

In 1980, Weiner represented Tartan Stable, the owner of the racehorse Codex in a challenge of the 1980 Preakness Stakes brought by the owners of the racehorse Genuine Risk. Television replays showed Cordero swing Codex wide and possibly brush against Genuine Risk. Weiner displayed photos showing the horses almost feet apart in contrast to the television footage. After testimony by dozens of witnesses, the Maryland Racing Commission ruled that any contact was incidental and allowed the result to stand.

In 2005, Weiner successfully represented the Baltimore Orioles and MASN in litigation brought by Comcast Mid-Atlantic Sports Network over the television rights to the Orioles, thereby creating MASN.

Weiner currently practices law in the Baltimore office of Rifkin Weiner Livingston LLC.

== See also ==
- Sheila Dixon trial
- Devan v. Ernst and Young
- Marvin Mandel
- Edward Garmatz
- MASN
