= Morris A. Mechanic Theatre =

Defunct theatre in Baltimore, Maryland, U.S.

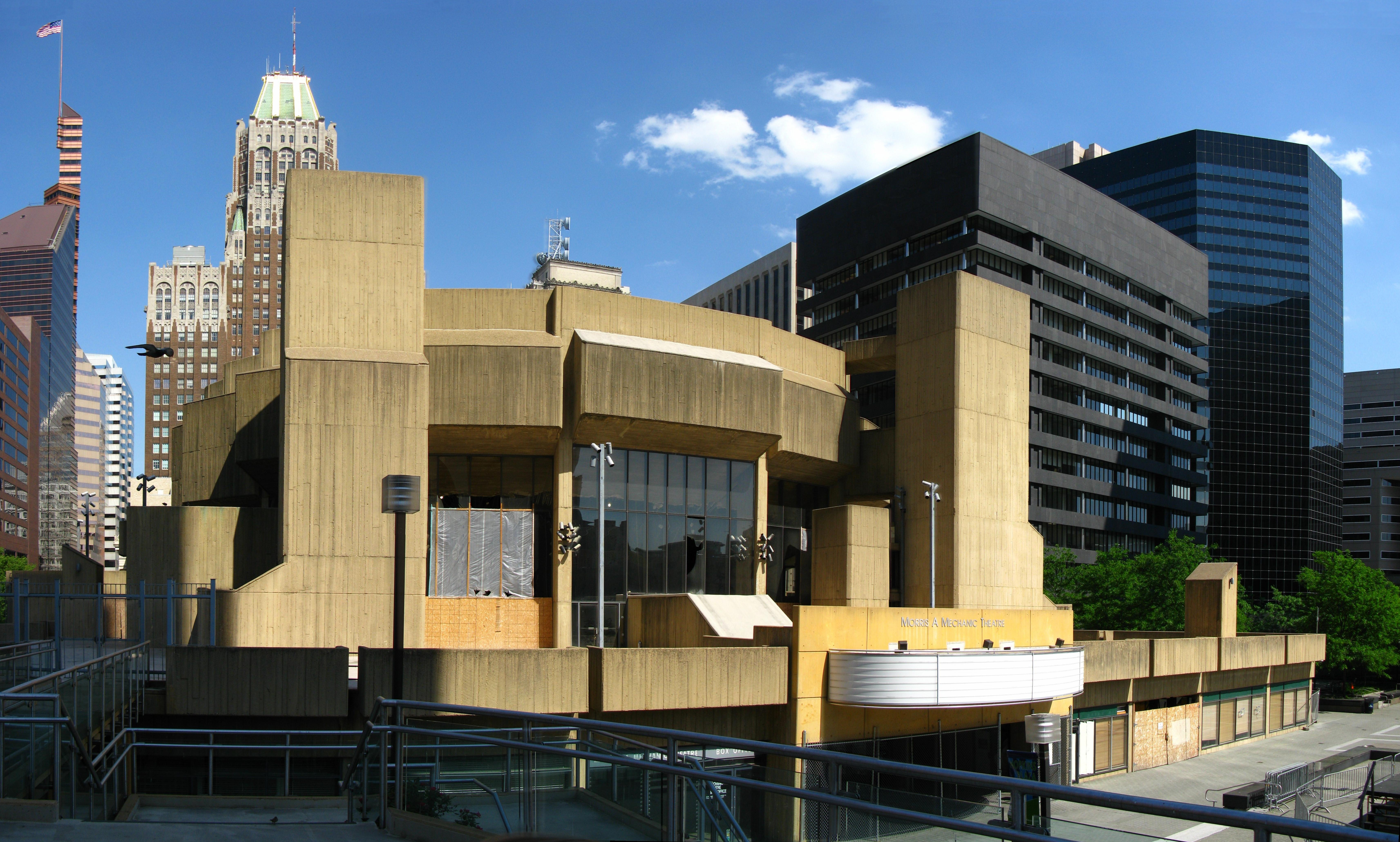
- Exterior view, with entrances and windows boarded up with lumber (May 2008)
- Interactive map of Morris A. Mechanic Theatre
- Address: 1 South Charles Street; Baltimore, Maryland; United States
- Coordinates: 39°17′20.5″N 76°36′56.75″W
- Capacity: 1,614

Construction
- Opened: 1967
- Closed: 2004
- Demolished: 2014
- Years active: 1967–2004

The Morris A. Mechanic Theatre was a playhouse at 1 South Charles Street that was part of the Charles Center of Baltimore, Maryland. The theatre was built by and named for owner Morris A. Mechanic who operated a number of theatres in the city such as The Stanton Theatre, Ford's Grand Opera House, the Centre Theatre, and the Century and Valencia Theatres, all of which have since been demolished except for the Centre. The Mechanic theatre was demolished in 2014.

== History ==
Mechanic planned the theatre to replace the aging Ford's Grand Opera House, which he had purchased in 1929 and had demolished in February 1964, replaced by a parking garage for Stewart's Department Store. A year later, he also had the Stanton Theatre (located at 516 North Howard Street) demolished in July 1965 (also replaced by a parking lot) to avoid any competition with his new theatre which bore his name. Mechanic bought the theatre from the Stanley Warner Corporation in February 1958 and changed the name to The Stanton in the fall of 1959, using it primarily for legitimate shows, closed-circuit television shows, variety shows, and movies and also including live performance shows which he leased to JF Theatres. He engaged architect John M. Johansen who designed the building in a style he termed "functional expressionism", also known as brutalism. Mechanic chose the site formerly occupied by offices of The Baltimore Sun.

Mechanic died in 1966 from a heart attack while the building was under construction and his widow, Clarisse, joined Mayor Theodore McKeldin and Eugene M. Feinblatt, chairman of the Baltimore Urban Renewal and Housing Agency, in presiding over the opening gala January 16, 1967. For many years, the theater was Baltimore's primary venue to host touring Broadway plays and helped the city shed its reputation as a "lousy theatre town".

Several Broadway-bound productions had their tryouts at the Mechanic. They include I'm Solomon, Jimmy Shine, Applause, The Wiz, Smile, Lend Me a Tenor, and Busker Alley.

However, in the 1980s and 1990s, producers felt that the theatre was too small and outdated to accommodate the larger shows of the era.

Jujamcyn Theaters began managing the Mechanic in 1998. SFX (later Clear Channel Entertainment) bought Jujamcyn's production arm in 2000. The theater ceased operation in 2004 when the restored Hippodrome Theatre reopened. Clear Channel Entertainment operated the Hippodrome and chose not to renew its lease on the Mechanic.

== Demolition and redevelopment plans ==
In 2005, Melvin and Benjamin Greenwald purchased the shuttered building for $6 million with plans to renovate it into retail space and add a 10-story residential building on the east side. Preservationists disagreed with the Greenwalds' assessment that there was "no historic integrity to the building" and urged that it be carefully adapted for reuse. After hearings in August 2007, the Baltimore Commission for Historical and Architecture Preservation declined to grant the building landmark status.

On February 25, 2009, David S. Brown Enterprises unveiled a plan to add a 30-story tower that would house a 161-room hotel and 250 rental units. The former theater space would be converted to retail and a skylight installed to make it more welcoming to shoppers. Architect Dan Stuver said the design aimed to retain the building's defining characteristics while adapting it to a new use. The plan did not contain cost estimates or details.

In 2012, the developer abandoned the 2009 plan and filed an application for demolition. While initially delayed due to historical preservation concerns, officials granted his request in March 2014. The underground parking garage was still in use until September 2014 although the theater closed ten years earlier. In September 2014, the parking garage closed and crews erected fences to begin demolition work, to be followed by construction of new high-rise residential and commercial space. As of 2021, no new construction had taken place.

In June 2022, redevelopment plans on the former Mechanic Theatre site have been announced to be on hold indefinitely until a tax break occurs.

== Architecture ==
The Mechanic Theater consisted of a square podium that housed retail space and an underground parking garage as part of the Charles Center. The fan-shaped auditorium that seated 1,614 sat atop the podium and had a street-level entrance on Hopkins Plaza as well as a pedestrian bridge that connected to an elevated walkway leading to other buildings in Charles Center. Balconies were behind the orchestra seats and protruded beyond the exterior walls to give the building the appearance of a ratchet gear when viewed from above.

The exterior of the building was rough concrete that bore the markings from the wooden forms used to create the walls. The street entrance on Hopkins Plaza led to a stairway that took patrons to the lobby on the second floor. The exterior lobby wall was glass while interior walls had a faux wood finish or were covered with burnt-orange vinyl. The plaza-level entrance was framed by towers holding stairs and elevators to access the balcony. The stage house was clearly defined as a separate element attached to the auditorium.

In November 2009, Virtual Tourist.com named the Mechanic Theatre as number one in its list of the Top Ten ugliest buildings.
