= Archibald C. Rogers =

- Born: September 29, 1917; Annapolis, Maryland
- Died: December 6, 2001 (aged 84); Baltimore
- Occupation: Architect
- Awards: Fellow of the American Institute of Architects
- Practice: RTKL Associates

Archibald Coleman Rogers FAIA (1917–2001) was an American architect and urban planner in practice in Annapolis and Baltimore, Maryland from 1946 to 1976. He was founder of the architectural firm later known as RTKL Associates and was president of the American Institute of Architects for the year 1974.

== Life and career ==
Archibald Coleman Rogers was born September 29, 1917, in Annapolis, Maryland to William Coleman Rogers and Margaret (Bryan) Rogers. He was educated at Princeton University, graduating with a BA in 1939 and an MFA in 1942. For several months in 1939–40 he worked for Cross & Cross in New York City. He served in the naval reserve from 1942 to 1946, thereafter returning home to Annapolis to open an architect's office. In 1949 he formed a partnership, Rogers & Taliaferro, with Francis T. Taliaferro. In 1956, the partnership was expanded to include Charles E. Lamb and again in 1961 to include George Kostritsky. As the practice expanded, Rogers and Kostritsky came to specialize in planning, rather than architecture.

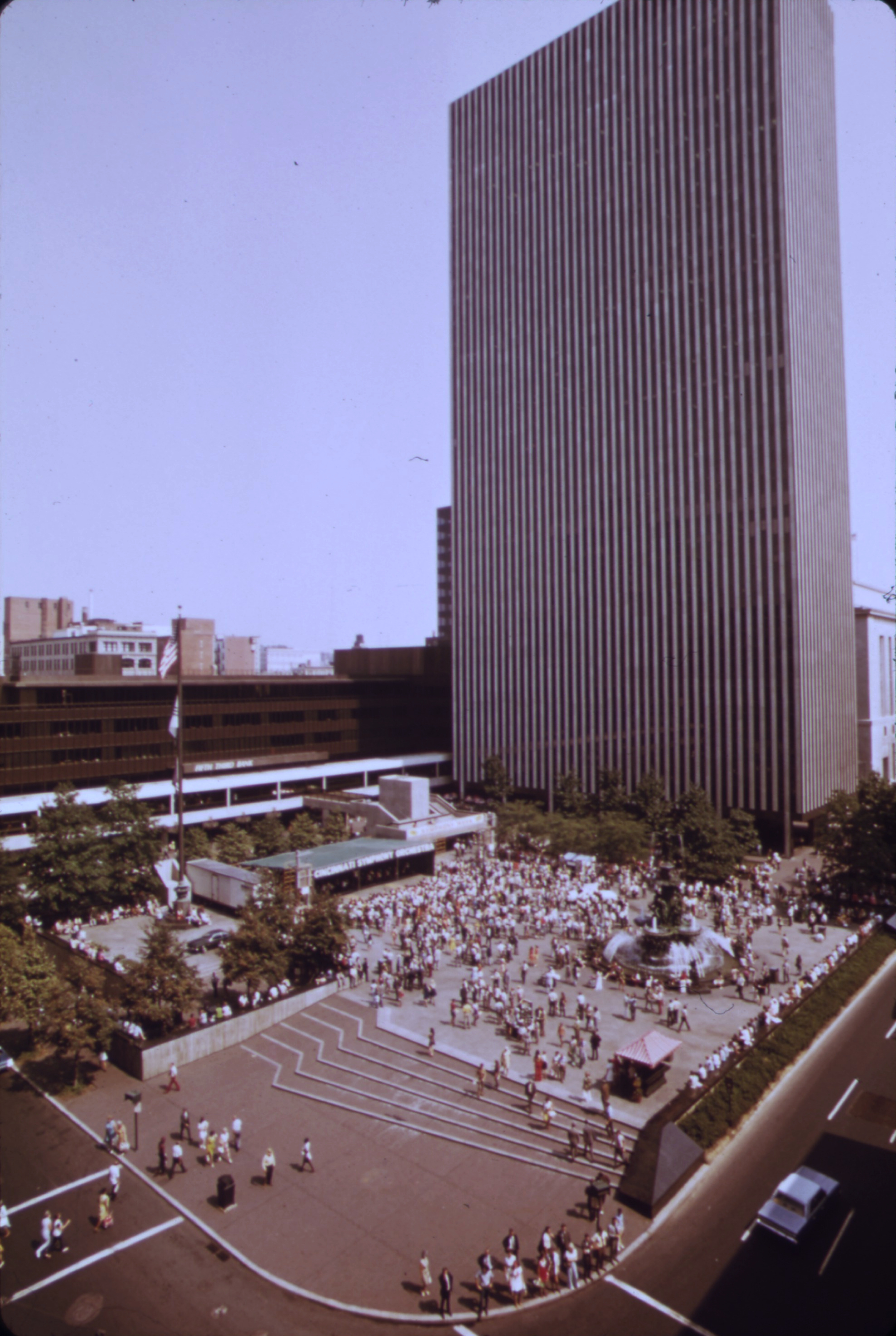
Fountain Square in Cincinnati, redesigned in 1968 by RKTL Associates and pictured in 1973.

Several urban planning projects that were led by Rogers include:

- Charles Center, Baltimore (1962)
- Redevelopment plan, Hartford, Connecticut (1962)
- Downtown plan, Cincinnati (1966)
- Downtown plan, Eugene, Oregon (1966)
- Fountain Square, Cincinnati (1968)
- Downtown plan, Jacksonville, Florida (1972)

Other projects completed by the firm include the Church of the Redeemer in Baltimore and the Dorsey College Center of Goucher College, both in association with Pietro Belluschi. In 1969, the firm was incorporated as RTKL Associates and moved its main office to Baltimore. In 1977, Rogers retired from active practice, though remained a consultant to the firm into the 1980s.

In 1946, Rogers was appointed zoning commissioner for Anne Arundel County. His advocacy for sound planning principles placed him at odds with the county commissioners, and he resigned in 1952. In 1955, he was selected by James Rouse to serve as the first executive director of the Greater Baltimore Committee, an organization he founded to revitalize central Baltimore, then in decline. He only served in the position for a year but filled an important organization role. In 1956, he was chosen to lead the Urban Design Concept Team, a group of engineers and planners responsible for routing interstate highways through Baltimore. In this capacity he opposed the routing of highways that would be particularly damaging to the urban fabric of Baltimore.

Rogers joined the American Institute of Architects in 1946 as a member of the Baltimore chapter. He served as chapter president and on several national committees before being elected first vice president/president elect for 1973 and president for 1974. In 1967, he was elected a Fellow and after his presidency was elected to honorary membership in the Royal Architectural Institute of Canada and the Society of Architects of Mexico.

== Personal life ==
Rogers was married in 1947 to Lucia Bernadine Evans, who died in 1984. He remarried to Eleanor Merry, who survived him. He died December 6, 2001, at home in Bolton Hill.

Rogers was the author of several novels, including The Monticello Fault (Durham: Moore Publishing Company, 1979).
