= United States Post Office and Courthouse (Baltimore, Maryland) =

- U.S. Post Office and Courthouse
- U.S. National Register of Historic Places
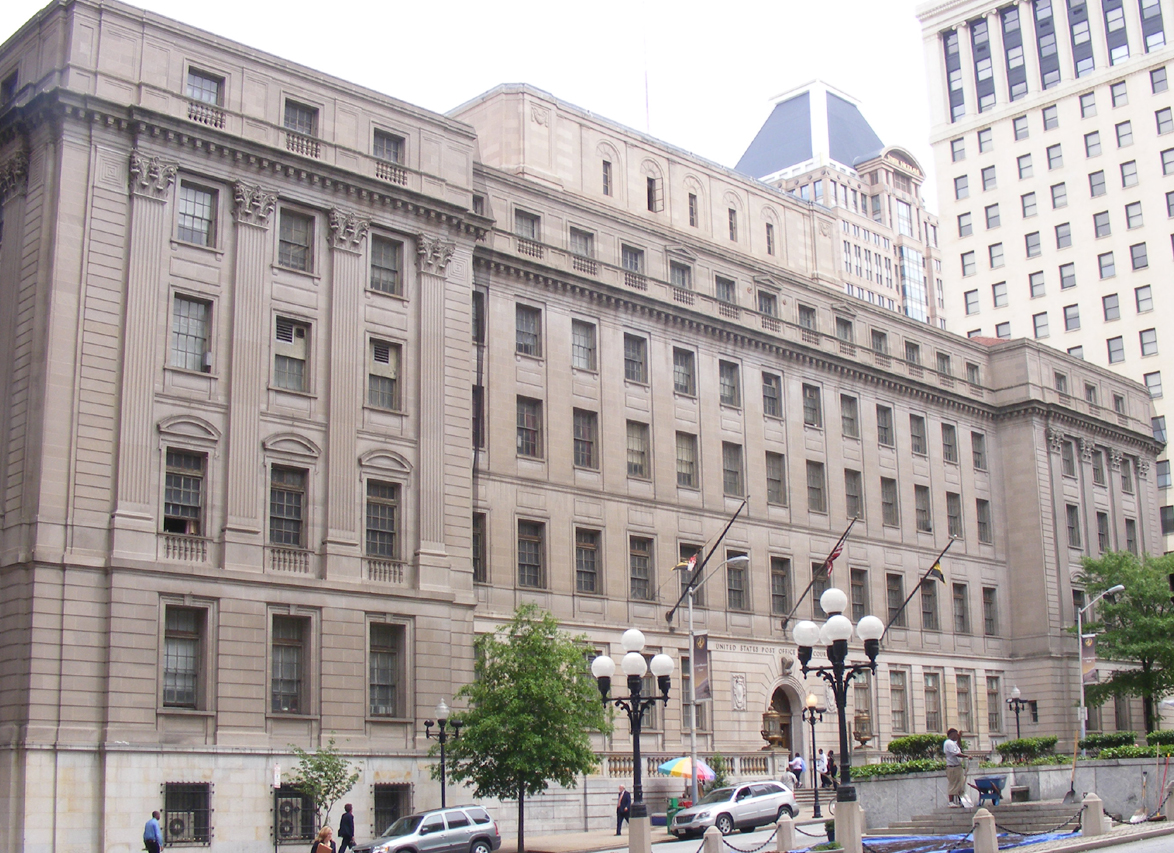
- Courthouse east facade, May 2008

- Location within Baltimore Location within Maryland Location within the United States
- Location: 111 N. Calvert St., Baltimore, Maryland
- Coordinates: 39°17′27″N 76°36′47″W
- Area: 1.3 acres (0.53 ha)
- Built: 1930
- Architect: Office of the Supervising Architect under James A. Wetmore
- Architectural style: Classical Revival
- NRHP reference No.: 77001530
- Added to NRHP: March 25, 1977

The United States Post Office and Courthouse is a historic combined post office and Federal courthouse located in Baltimore, Maryland, United States.

== Description ==
The building occupies an entire city block and measures 238 ft 2 in (72.59 m) east-west by 279 ft 10 in (85.29 m) north-south. It is of steel frame construction with concrete floors and tile roof, basement of granite, and outer walls of white Indiana limestone. The structure is six stories in height and provided with basement and two sub-basements. It was completed in 1932 under the supervision the Office of the Supervising Architect under James A. Wetmore, and features classical ornamentation.

== Cases ==
Some notable court cases held in this building include:

- 1934: Judge W. Calvin Chesnut became the first jurist to strike down a New Deal Act of Congress.
- 1948: Alger Hiss filed a libel suit against Whittaker Chambers
- 1968 and 1969: the Berrigans were indicted in this courthouse for destroying Federal records as a protest against the Vietnam War.
- 1973: Vice President Spiro T. Agnew pleaded nolo contendere to tax evasion and resigned as Vice President.
- 2009: Mayor Sheila Dixon was tried for 12 counts including perjury, theft and misconduct. She was convicted of fraudulent misappropriation and eventually resigned as mayor as part of a plea bargain in the Sheila Dixon trial.

== Present ==
The U.S. Post Office and Courthouse was listed on the National Register of Historic Places in 1977. It has since been conveyed to the City of Baltimore, and is in use by the Baltimore city courts. For many years, the courthouse was known colloquially as Courthouse East. On January 17, 2020, Baltimore Mayor Bernard C. Jack Young announced that the courthouse would be renamed the Elijah E. Cummings Courthouse in honor of the late 12-term United States representative and civil rights activist from Baltimore.

== See also ==
- List of United States federal courthouses in Maryland
