= Inner Harbor East, Baltimore =

Human settlement in Maryland, US

Coordinates: 39°16′59.5″N 76°36′5.75″W

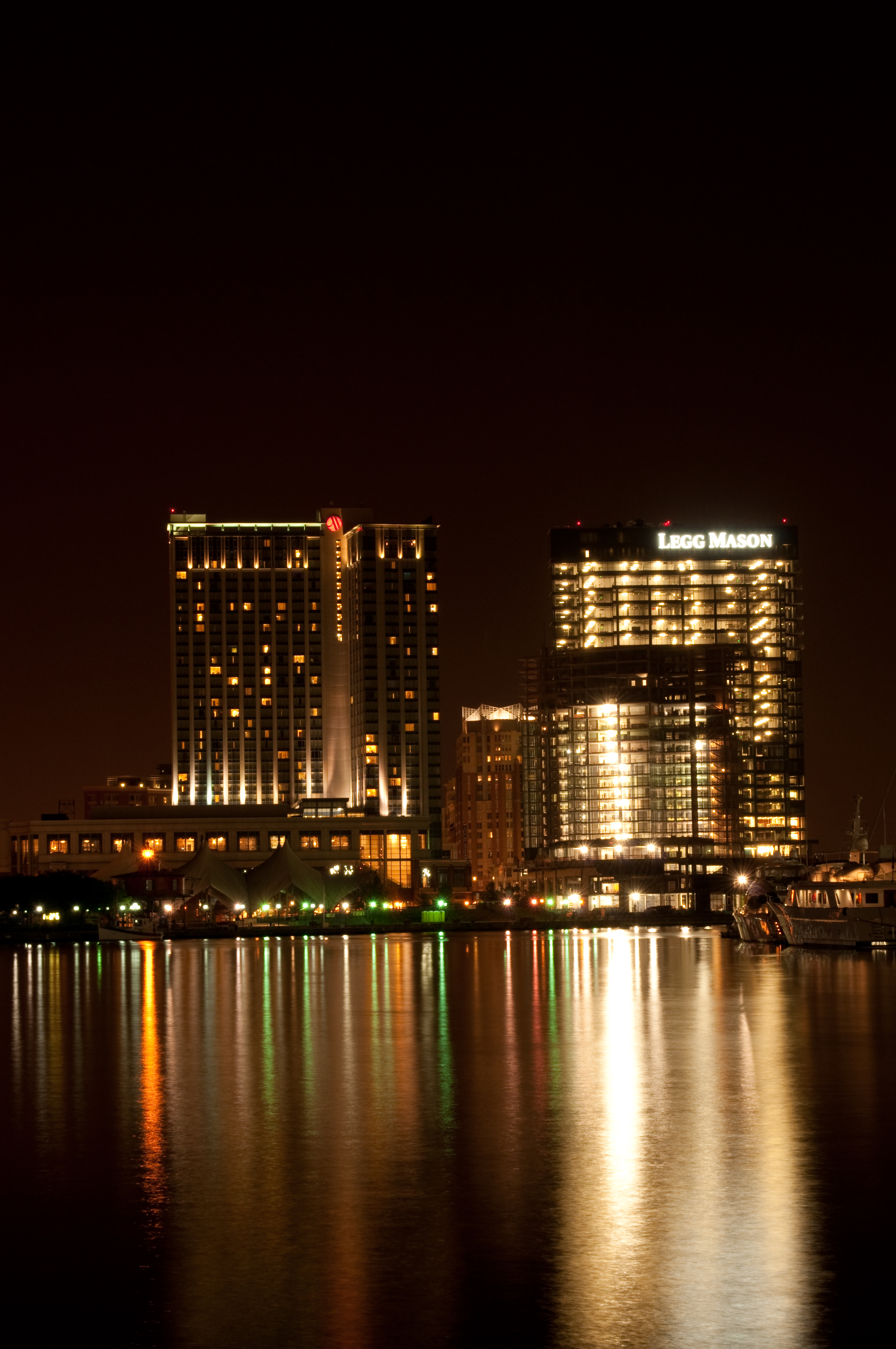
Harbor East pictured from the western side of the Inner Harbor in 2019

Inner Harbor East, sometimes referred to simply as Harbor East, is a mixed-use development project in Baltimore, Maryland, United States. Major tenants of Harbor East include Marriott International and Legg Mason. A Four Seasons Hotel opened in November 2011.

== History ==
Baltimore's Inner Harbor waterfront was filled with decaying warehouses from the industrial boom in the 1900s. Development was done under the auspices of a Land Disposition Agreement between the city of Baltimore and the Baltimore Development Corporation, the agency charged with such projects. The development integrated Harbor East with Fells Point and Little Italy through re-zoning, land subdivisions and more.

In 1983, Baltimore began the planning process with the hiring of Stan Eckstut of Cooper Eckstut Associates prior to John Paterakis' purchase of the land that would become Inner Harbor East. The Land Disposition Agreement was signed in 1993 with construction and retail following throughout the 1990s.

== Design ==
The initial plan stressed both sidewalks and streets to connect residents and visitors to the waterfront. "The public space system was highlighted by a 2,000-foot (610 m) waterfront promenade that acts as a link to the Inner Harbor and to other nearby residential areas; bikers, joggers, and leisurely strollers bustle along this waterfront space."

The idea was to decrease the height of the buildings near the waterfront to create views of both the waterfront and the city, incorporated aspects of Mount Vernon Place with those of the Fells Point and Little Italy neighborhoods.

The masterplan received a National Honor Award for Urban Design from the American Institute of Architects.
