= Devan v. Ernst & Young LLP =

Devan v. Ernst and Young is a 1998 lawsuit filed in Baltimore City Circuit Court against Ernst & Young that resulted in the largest single defendant settlement in Maryland history.

== History ==
Filed in 1998, the case named Deborah H. Devan, Chapter 7 Trustee for Merry-Go-Round Enterprises v. Ernst & Young LLP alleged the accounting firm of duplicity and bad advice while providing turnaround accounting services. The lawsuit accused Ernst and Young of concealing its relationship with Washington D.C. law firm Swidler and Berlin, which had recommended Ernst and Young as the turnaround adviser. Swidler and Berlin were representing the accounting firm in a West Virginia lawsuit at the time. The assertion was also made that Ernst and Young assigned junior personnel who gave incompetent advise. At the time of the settlement, experts comment it to be the first case to assign liability of a consultant brought in to manage the turnaround of a bankrupt company being held liable for its failure.

Merry-Go-Round filed a Chapter 11 bankruptcy in 1994, but was unable to successfully reorganize.

Lead attorneys Snyder, Weltchek, Weiner, and Vogelstein argued the firm "violated the standard of care", a tenet applied from medical malpractice cases they had experience. This argument is akin to a doctor's error in a medical malpractice lawsuit.

Ernst and Young admitted no wrongdoing and "believes other parties bear substantial responsibility for the failure of Merry-Go-Round to survive. The firm will look to these parties for contribution to the settlement."

$135 million of the settlement was covered by insurance, according to Ernst and Young.

== Important figures in the case ==
- Deborah Hunt Devan - Bankruptcy trustee, filed lawsuit
- Stephen L. Snyder - Senior Partner, Plaintiff
- Robert J. Weltchek - Partner, Plaintiff
- Arnold M. Weiner - Partner, Plaintiff
- William "Billy" H. Murphy, Jr. - Attorney, Plaintiff
- Larry S. Gibson - Attorney, Plaintiff
- Kathleen O'Farrall Friedman - Baltimore Circuit Court Judge
