= RTKL Associates =

Former architecture, planning and design firm

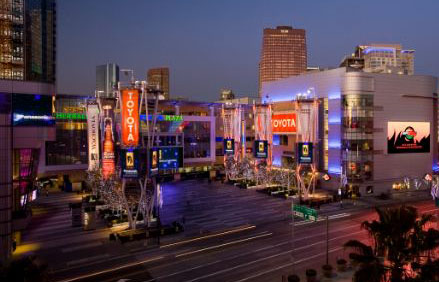
L.A. Live in Los Angeles

RTKL was a global architecture, planning and design firm. The firm was founded in 1946 by Archibald C. Rogers and Francis T. Taliaferro in Rogers’ grandmother’s basement in Annapolis and grew to be one of the largest architectural firms in the world prior to its acquisition by Arcadis NV in 2007. In October 2015, RTKL was formally merged with another Arcadis subsidiary, Seattle-based Callison, to form CallisonRTKL headquartered in Baltimore.

The firm's name, RTKL, originated from the initials of its initial members, Rogers, Taliaferro, Kostritsky, and Lamb.

== History ==
=== 20th century ===
The firm was founded by Archibald C. Rogers in his grandmother's basement in Annapolis, Maryland. Francis T. Taliaferro joined shortly afterwards. In 1949, the pair hired Charles E. Lamb, whose design for the Anne Arundel County Girl Scouts Teepee Lodge gained the firm national attention by winning an award from the American Institute of Architects.

Rogers and Taliaferro's reputation grew when, in 1954, internationally renowned architect Pietro Belluschi selected the firm as his associate architect for the design of the Church of the Redeemer in Baltimore. The project received an AIA Award of Merit and, in 1986, a special 25-Year Award from the AIA's Baltimore Chapter. In 1956, Lamb was made a partner in the firm, which changed its name to Rogers, Taliaferro and Lamb.

The addition of urban design specialist George Kostritsky in 1961 completed the foursome, and the "Rogers, Taliaferro, Kostritsky and Lamb" name was condensed to "RTKL". In that same year RTKL was commissioned to design the public spaces for the Charles Center, which contributed to Baltimore’s urban renewal movement. Largely because of the success of this involvement, the firm was commissioned to develop downtown plans for Cincinnati, Ohio, Hartford, Connecticut, and Charlotte, North Carolina, among other U.S. cities. The firm continued to expand in the next decades, opening offices across the company and overseas. RTKL also grew through acquisitions.

=== 21st century ===
In 2000, RTKL acquired Dallas-based FDS International, a health practice ranked among the top ten in the country. Later RTKL bought the Miami-based Howard Snoweiss Design Group, a design company, with an eye towards expanding its business in Latin America and the Caribbean.

In 2007, RTKL became a wholly owned subsidiary of Arcadis NV, an international company that delivers consulting, design, engineering, urban planning, architectural and project management services for infrastructure, environment and buildings.

In August 2010, the firm purchased Beijing-based AHS International, a practice that specialized in healthcare and medical-facility architecture.

In 2011, Building Design ranked RTKL'a retail sector first in the world, its planning services third, and its urban design services fifth.

== Projects ==
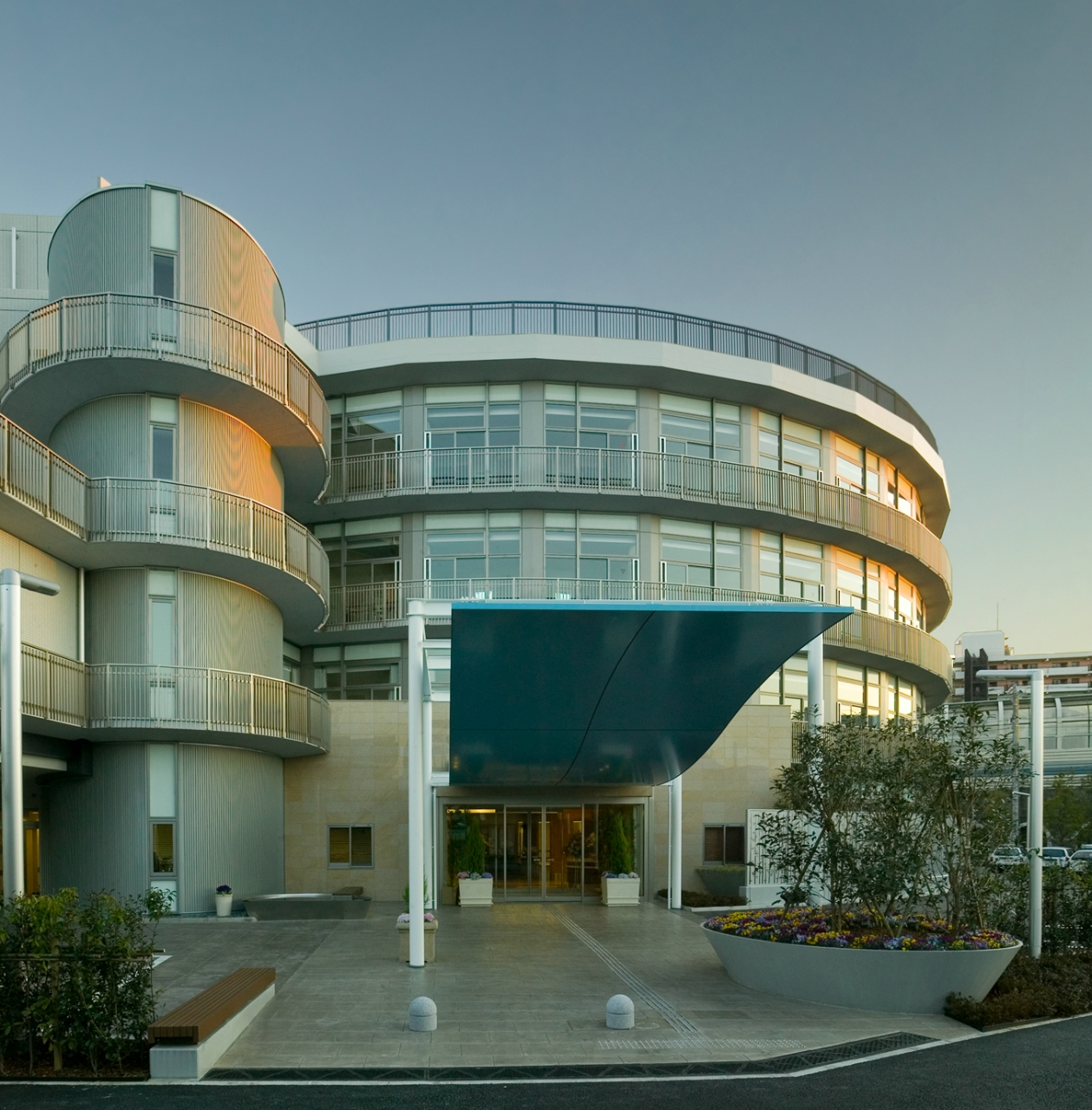
Tokyo Bay Rehabilitation Hospital in Tokyo, Japan

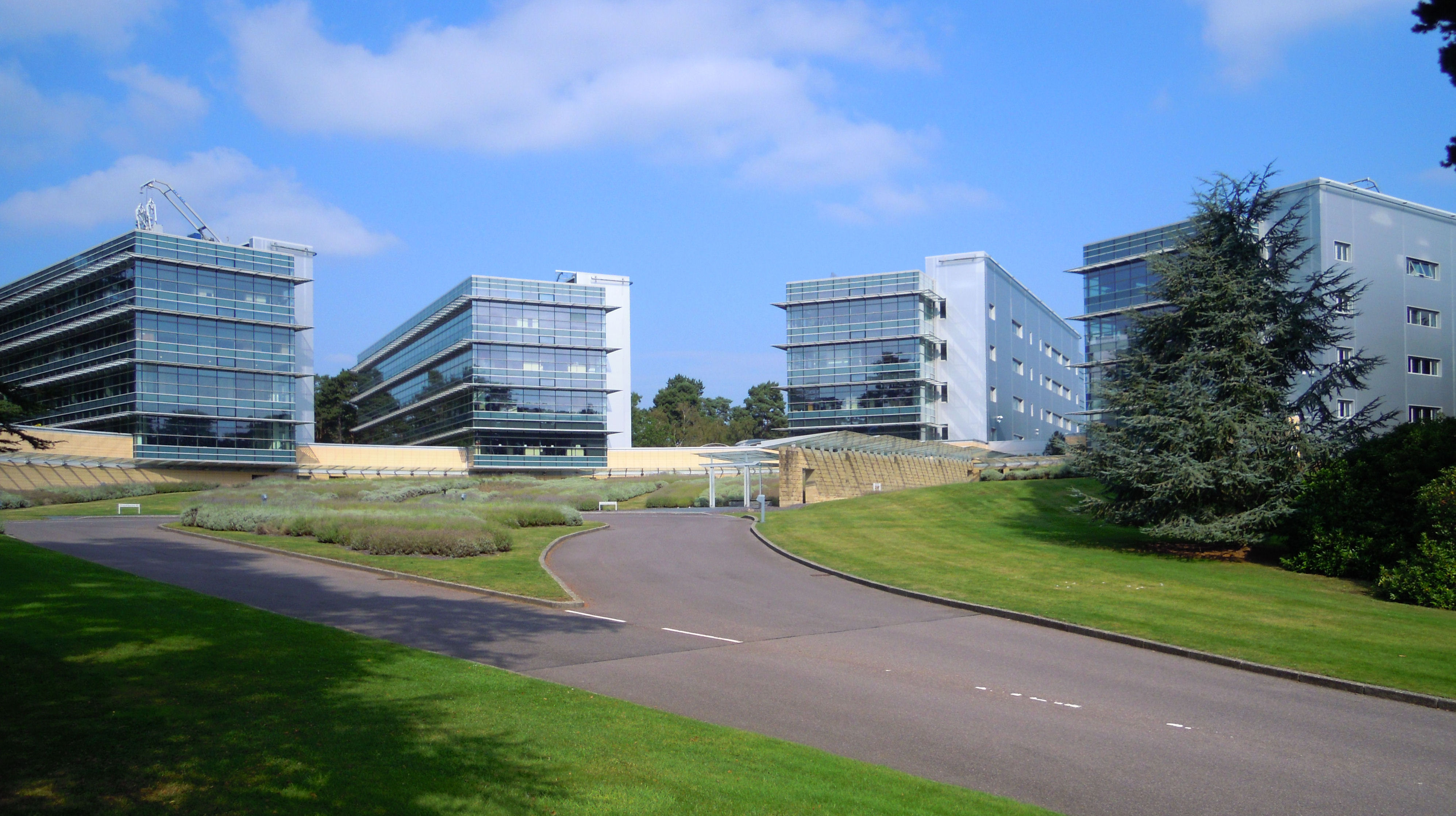
Royal Pavilion Office Park in Aldershot

- Harundale Mall in Glen Burnie, Maryland (1958)
- Baltimore Inner Harbor Super Cube Street Lamps (1960s–1990s)
- Paramus Park Mall in Paramus, New Jersey (1974)
- Edward A. Garmatz United States Courthouse in Baltimore, Maryland (1976)
- Beachwood Place Mall in Cleveland, Ohio (1978)
- Collin Creek Mall in Plano, Texas (1981)
- White Marsh Mall in White Marsh, Maryland (1981)
- Burlington Center Mall in Burlington Township, New Jersey (1982)
- Fifth Third Center in Cleveland
- Stratford Square Mall in Bloomingdale, Illinois (1981)
- Owings Mills Fashion Mall in Owings Mills, Maryland (1986)
- Westlake Center Mall and Westlake Office Tower in Seattle, Washington (1988)
- Harbourside Shopping Centre in Australia (1988)
- Arizona Center in Phoenix, Arizona (1990)
- Pioneer Place Mall and Pioneer Office Tower in Portland, Ohio (1990)
- Chase Financial Plaza in Cleveland (1991)
- Fairfax County Government Center in Fairfax County, Virginia (1992)
- Katy Mills Mall in Katy, Texas (1999)
- Mandarin Oriental Hotel in Miami (2000)
- Redesign of the damaged Pentagon following the September 11th attacks Arlington County, Virginia (2002)
- North East Mall in Hurst, Texas (2001)
- Royal Pavilion in Aldershot, UK (2002)
- Shanghai Museum of Science and Technology in Shanghai
- Chinese Museum of Film in Beijing (2004)
- Principe Pio in Madrid (2004)
- The Heart Hospital Baylor Plano in Plano, Texas (2005)
- New Jiang Wan Cultural Center in Shanghai (2005)
- Reginald F. Lewis Museum of Maryland African American History & Culture in Baltimore (2005)
- Silver Cross Hospital Campus in New Lenox, Illinois (2005)
- John Radcliffe Hospital in Oxford, England (2006)
- Westfield in San Francisco (2006)
- Community Hospital North Expansion in Indianapolis (2007)
- Naberezhnaya Tower in Moscow (2007)
- Tokyo Bay Rehabilitation Hospital in Tokyo (2007)
- L.A. Live in Los Angeles (2008)
- U.S. Capitol Visitor Center in Washington, D.C. (2008)
- City Crossing in Shenzhen (2009)
- American Society of Hematology in Washington, D.C. (2010)
- eBay Data Center in Salt Lake City (2010)
- Mirdif City Centre in Dubai, United Arab Emirates (2010)
- U.S. FDA headquarters in White Oak, Maryland (2012)
- Shanghai Changzheng New Pudong Hospital in Shanghai (2014)
