= Adah Jenkins =

Civil rights activist, musician, and music critic (1901–1973)

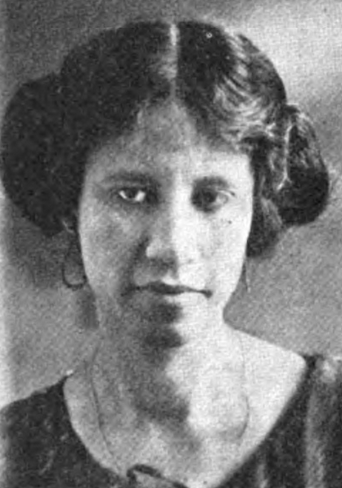
- Adah L. Killion from a 1925 issue of The Crisis
- Born: Adah Louise Killion; April 23, 1901; Baltimore
- Died: May 8, 1973 (aged 72); Baltimore
- Occupations: Musician, educator
- Known for: Civil rights activist

Adah Louise Killion Jenkins (April 23, 1901 – May 8, 1973) was a civil rights activist, musician, teacher, and a music critic for the Afro-American newspaper.

== Early life ==
Adah Louise Killion was born and raised in Baltimore, Maryland, the daughter of Dr, Thomas A. Killion and Mollie L. Trusty Killion. Her father was a doctor who died when Adah was only two years old. Her mother's sister, Lillian Handy Trusty, was a longtime teacher in Baltimore, and a member of the NAACP. Adah Killion attended the Teachers Training College, now Coppin State University.

== Career ==
=== Teaching ===
Jenkins taught in Baltimore City Public Schools, where she became the first Black supervisor of music, and the Coppin Teacher Training College. Jenkins became a professor of music at Morgan State University. She was on the founding executive committee of the Maryland State Music Teachers Association. Her piano students included singer and music educator Bill Myers, and organist and music professor Hansonia Mitchell.

=== The Baltimore Civil Rights Movement ===
During the Civil Rights Movement, Jenkins was involved with many activist groups. She helped to organize the Baltimore Interracial Fellowship and she was a charter member and vice-chair of the Baltimore chapter of the Congress of Racial Equality (CORE). The Baltimore CORE participated in a number of protests, but at times its members suffered from lack of focus. Jenkins felt that some factions within the group were more interested in actions (picketing) than in meetings and negotiations, writing to the national organization there "seems to be more interest in new places to picket than in trying to finish some of the jobs already begun." Jenkins also felt that some of the black members of the chapter shied away from activism for fear of offending the white members.

Ms. Jenkins was also a key organizer and picketer in the organized protests to integrate Ford's Theater in Baltimore. Jenkins served as music critic for the Afro-American for 23 years. She was also active in the work of Fellowship House, a program of the Baltimore Interracial Fellowship. Baltimore activist A. Robert Kaufman considered Jenkins his "mentor".

== Personal life ==
Adah Killion married James Logan Jenkins Jr. She was a widow when she died at the age of 72 on May 8, 1973. Two of her children, Rebekah Jenkins Bain and Thomas Killion Jenkins, survived her. A concert tribute to Jenkins was presented in 1975, and a scholarship in the Morgan State University department of music was named in her memory.
