= Trial of Sheila Dixon =

2009 trial of the mayor of Baltimore, Maryland, US

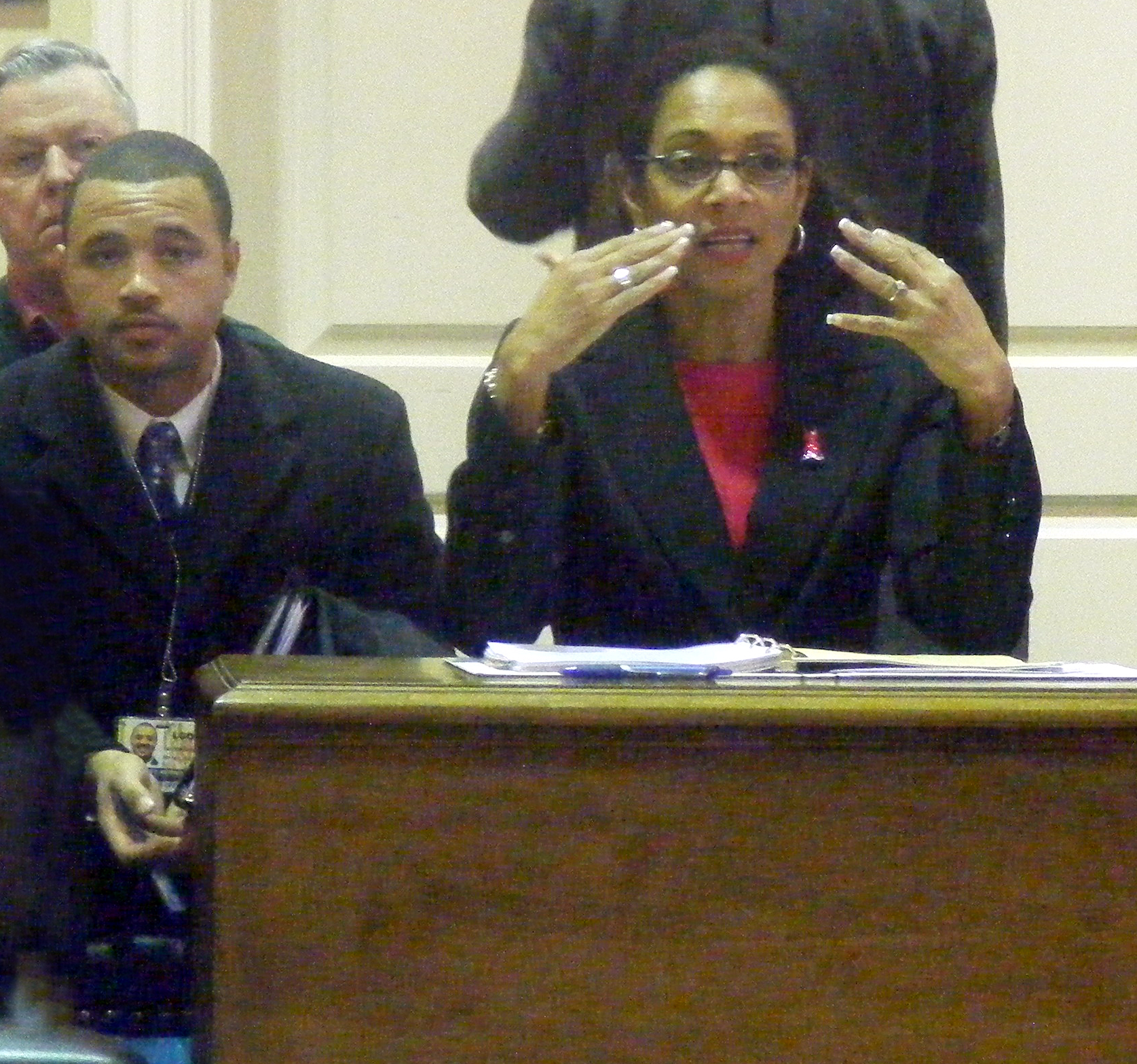
Former Baltimore mayor Sheila Dixon resigned following conviction in her first of two scheduled trials in a plea bargain

The trial of Sheila Dixon, then mayor of Baltimore, started on November 9, 2009. It was the first of two scheduled trials for Dixon on a variety of charges. The charges stemmed from alleged corruption on the part of the mayor involving gifts she allegedly received and gift cards she allegedly stole.

A verdict was reached on December 1, 2009. Dixon was convicted on one count of misappropriation of gift cards. The jury was hung on one other count, and all others resulted in acquittal.

The case against her left speculation about her future. While the city of Baltimore has no provision for removing a mayor from office, the Maryland Constitution bars convicted felons from serving in elected office. On January 6, 2010, Dixon announced she would step down as mayor on February 4, 2010.

The charges against her also resulted in a snub by President Barack Obama. Obama reversed an invitation of Dixon to the White House in a conference of seventy mayors, supposedly due to the charges she was facing. This was despite the fact that Dixon had endorsed Obama for president during the election and his arrival in Baltimore days before the inauguration.

== Events leading up to the trial ==
=== Investigation and indictment ===
On June 17, 2008, investigators from the Office of the State Prosecutor executed a search and seizure warrant at Dixon's residence in southwest Baltimore. The result of, or purpose for the search was not immediately revealed by investigators. However, several subpoenas were issued to aides, and local reports indicate that the investigation includes a look at gifts, including several fur coats, as well as Dixon's spending habits. The affidavit filed to support a search warrant on the company Doracon was published on the Baltimore Sun's website on June 23, 2008. The affidavit states that Dixon is being investigated regarding bribery.

On January 9, 2009, Dixon was indicted by a Baltimore Grand Jury on twelve counts, comprising four counts of perjury, two counts of misconduct, three counts of theft, and three counts of fraudulent misappropriations.

Dixon continued her work following her indictment, despite the charges.

The case was later dropped, but a new set of charges were filed after the evidence was re-organized.

Dixon's trial, originally scheduled for September 8, 2009, was postponed to November 9, 2009.

== Charges ==
Dixon's indictment included the following charges:

- Four counts of perjury for failure to list gift cards on financial disclosure statements from the fiscal years 2004–2006.
- Three counts of theft of more than $500 of gift cards that she had solicited for donations to needy families, but had then used for personal use.
- Three counts of fraudulent misappropriation by a fiduciary for the use of the gift cards on various dates at various stores.
- One count of corruptly stealing and converting for her own use Toys R Us gift cards purchased by Baltimore City.
- One count of misconduct in office.

== The trial ==
The trial for all the non-perjury charges opened on November 10, 2009, with a plea of not guilty.

=== Dixon's response to trial ===
Despite her career and freedom being on the line, Dixon held the attitude throughout the trial that it'll be "business as usual" for the city of Baltimore. Outside of court hours, she continued to conduct city business and making appearances.

She reported "excitement" about the trial, due to the prospect of putting it behind her.

=== Participants ===
Dennis M. Sweeney, a retired Howard County judge, was appointed to be the judge presiding over the trial.

Arnold M. Weiner was Dixon's lead defense attorney.

=== Key witnesses ===
Ronald Lipscomb was originally scheduled to testify against Dixon as part of a plea deal. Lipscomb dated Dixon in 2004, and was alleged to have provided Dixon with gifts. As a developer, he had won contracts in some high-profile projects around the city. Lipscomb ultimately did not testify because the prosecution believed that the defense would attack his credibility. This led to two of the seven charges being dropped.

=== Jury selection ===
The initial days of the trial were dedicated to jury selection. It was recommended by media that the defense select middle-aged African-American females, similar to Dixon.

The state made an unusual move of hiring a private consultant for the trial. Ronald Matlon, a retired Towson University professor, was hired to help the state in selecting jurors. The defense attorneys used social media during jury selection and found potential jurors had been tweeting about the case during jury selection.

Twelve jurors were picked, along with six alternates.

Dixon left the courtroom after the first day describing the trial to reporters as "interesting."

=== Dropping of two charges ===
On November 17, 2009, two of the charges were dropped. These charges pertained to those for which Lipscomb was supposed to testify. The judge ruled that without his testimony, there would not be enough evidence that would allow for conviction. This left five charges remaining.

=== Deliberations ===
Deliberations proceeded for seven days without a verdict. During that time, the foreperson sent multiple requests to the court for more information and instructions.

One juror had questions regarding whether Dixon acted with "the intent to deprive the owner of property". The juror wanted to know if intent could be determined by the actions of the defendant at the time of the action, or at a later date. The judge did not provide specific guidance and told the juror to refer to the juror's instructions.

=== Guilty verdict ===
On December 1, 2009, the jury found Dixon guilty on one charge of misdemeanor embezzlement for violating her fiduciary duties to the city and citizens of Baltimore by using approximately $530 in retail store gift cards intended to be distributed to needy families.

She was found not guilty on two more serious felony theft charges, and not guilty on one charge of misconduct of office. The jury was unable to come to a verdict regarding a second charge of misdemeanor embezzlement.

==== Response to verdict ====
Responses to the verdict from the jurors and citizens around the Baltimore area were mixed.

One juror, Elaine Pollack, known as "Juror no. 11," admitted after the jury that she had kept secret from her family and employer that she was a juror throughout the trial, and her mother did not know at the Thanksgiving dinner that she had been entertaining a Dixon juror. Pollack had also encountered Dixon during the trial when she attended the unveiling of a new flamingo at Cafe Hon, an event at which Dixon was present. Pollack was also one of several jurors who texted each other via Facebook, prompting, in part, Ms. Dixon's post trial motions.

=== Return to work while awaiting sentencing ===
In the days following the conviction, Dixon returned to her job as mayor. Under the Maryland Constitution, Article XV, section 2, an elected official of Maryland or any incorporated municipality in the state of Maryland is suspended from office once convicted of a felony or misdemeanor relating to his or her duties and responsibilities. Although a jury had found Dixon guilty on one misdemeanor count, she was not formally convicted until sentenced by the presiding judge, thus allowing her to remain in office.

Former Baltimore mayor Kurt L. Schmoke stated that Dixon owed her constituents an apology.

== Resignation ==
On January 6, 2010, as part of a plea agreement reached with prosecutors, Dixon announced that she was resigning as Mayor, effective February 4, 2010. Per the Baltimore city charter, City Council President Stephanie Rawlings-Blake succeeded her. Under the terms of the agreement Dixon will get probation before judgment (PBJ) in the recent case where she had been found guilty, as well as in a perjury trial that had been scheduled for March, 2010. Under the Criminal Procedure Article, sec. 6-220 of the Annotated Code of Maryland, a PBJ is not a conviction, thereby enabling her to keep her $83,000 pension. Also, under Maryland law, a PBJ may be expunged from one's record once the probationary period is over.

Dixon was sentenced to four years of probation under the terms of the agreement. She also will be required to donate $45,000 to the Bea Gaddy Foundation and to serve 500 hours of community service at Our Daily Bread. In addition, she has agreed to sell gifts she received from developers, including a fur coat and electronics that she purchased with gift cards. She agreed to not seek office in the city of Baltimore or state of Maryland during the term of her probation and she will not solicit or accept taxpayer money to pay her defense fees.

== Subsequent charges ==
In November 2012, Dixon was charged with violating the terms of her probation, for failure to make restitution payments to charity on schedule. Dixon, however, made her full payments to charity and her probation was lifted after December 2012.

== See also ==
- Arnold M. Weiner
