= Edward A. Garmatz United States Courthouse =

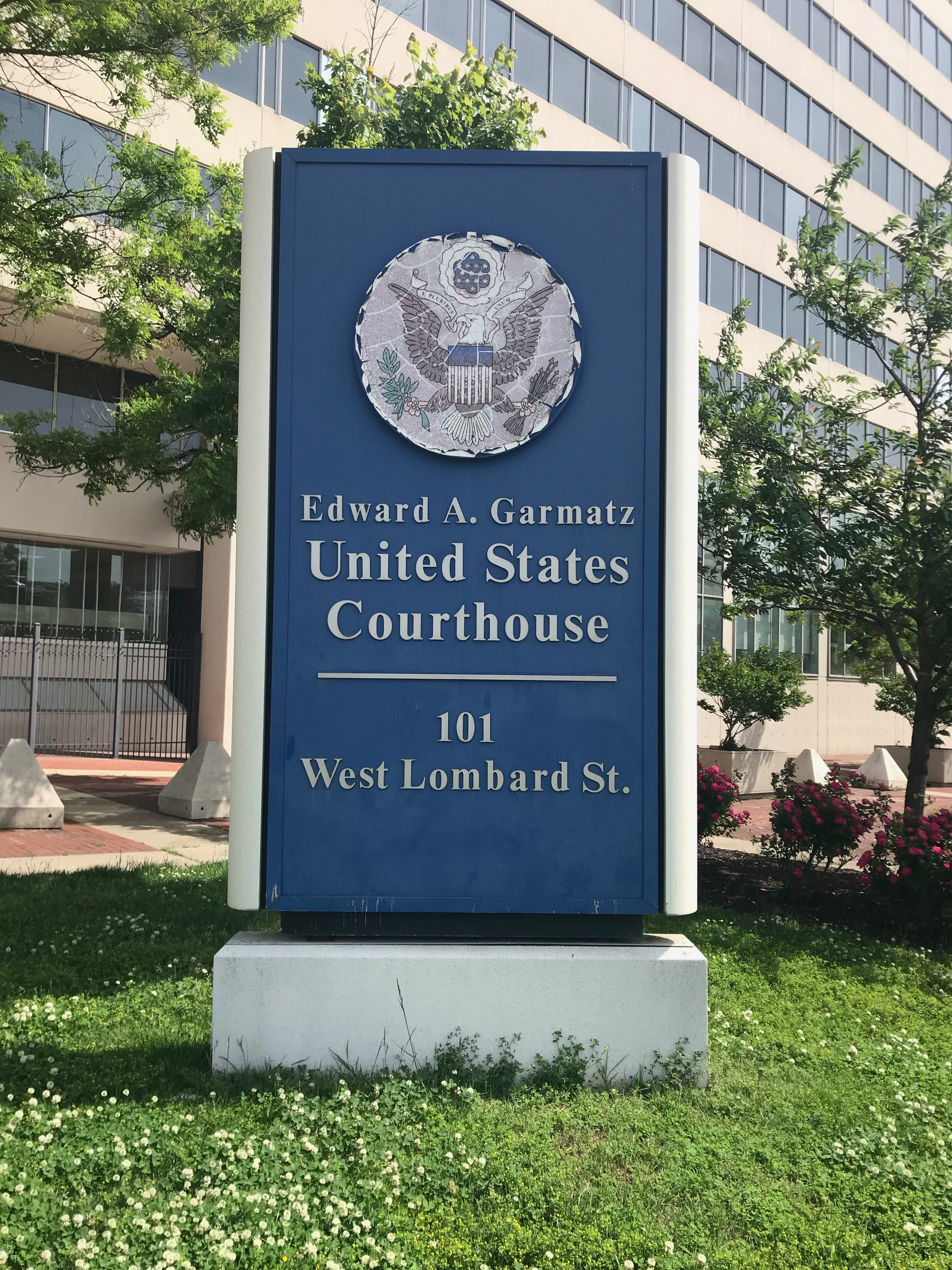
- Edward A. Garmatz Federal Building & U.S. Courthouse
- Interactive map of the Edward A. Garmatz United States Courthouse area

General information
- Type: Courthouse
- Architectural style: Modern
- Location: 101 West Lombard Street, Baltimore, Maryland, United States
- Coordinates: 39°17′14″N 76°37′2″W
- Construction started: 1972
- Completed: 1976
- Cost: USD $23 million

Design and construction
- Architecture firm: RTKL Associates
- Main contractor: Baltimore Contractors

The Edward A. Garmatz U.S. Courthouse is a courthouse of the United States District Court for the District of Maryland. It is located in Baltimore, Maryland.

== Building history ==
During the 1960s, the federal courts in Baltimore occupied the old U.S. Courthouse and Post Office, now known as Courthouse East, on Calvert Street. The courts rapidly outgrew their facilities, however, and required a larger building to accommodate the growing caseload. In 1970, the U.S. General Services Administration selected a 2.5-acre (10,000 m^{2}) parcel of land bounded by West Pratt, West Lombard, and South Hanover streets and Hopkins Place for a new federal courthouse. Congress allocated funding for the proposed building the same year. The courthouse was designed by RTKL Associates and contains elements of the International Style of architecture, first popularized in the 1930s in Europe and later adopted for federal buildings in the United States. The International Style does not reference regional architectural trends, so similar buildings can be found throughout the United States.

In 1972, the building was named to honor Edward A. Garmatz (1903–1986). Garmatz, who was born and died in Baltimore, was a U.S. Representative for Maryland from 1947 to 1973, serving as the chairman of the Committee on Merchant Marine and Fisheries for much of his political career. Garmatz was elected during a special vote after Thomas D'Alesandro, Jr., resigned his Congressional seat to become mayor of Baltimore.

Completed in 1976 at a cost of $23 million, the new Edward A. Garmatz Federal Building and U.S. Courthouse had 532,020 gross square feet. The federal courts occupied the building later the same year. On May 1, 1978, a dedication ceremony was held in the plaza adjoining the building. In 2004, in Courtroom 5-D of the building, Ed Norris, former superintendent of the Maryland State Police, pleaded guilty to charges that he made illegal personal expenditures from the Baltimore Police Department's discretionary fund while serving as the department's commissioner.

The building's tenants include the U.S. District Court, U.S. Bankruptcy Court, and the U.S. Court of Appeals.

== Architecture ==
The construction of this building was part of an early phase of redevelopment for the area west of the Inner Harbor. Designed by RTKL Associates, a Baltimore-based, multidisciplinary firm of architects, engineers, and planners, the building exhibits characteristics of the International Style of architecture including a simple cubic mass, lack of ornamentation, and horizontal bands of windows. [1,2,3] The designers embraced contemporary trends, materials, and technology to develop an efficient and economical building that eschewed elaborate designs of earlier federal architecture. The nine-story box-like building has an L-shaped footprint with a flat roof. The building is a poured-concrete shell with a strong exterior horizontal emphasis created by alternating concrete strips and bands of fixed windows. The windows are separated by narrow aluminum mullions.

Interior spaces evoke the clean, Modern exterior of the courthouse. Pale grey terrazzo floors and white walls are accented with dark grey painted surfaces and aluminum and silvertone metallic details such as handrails and vent grilles. Green marble panels cover elevator lobby walls, and granite tiles in pale and dark tones cover the floor. Gleaming steel elevator doors and surrounds reinforce the Modern interior design features and finishes. Courtrooms, some of which have been altered to make them appear more Classical, have dark wood wainscoting and jury boxes. Coffered ceilings contain both recessed lighting and hemispherical pendant lights. Clerestory windows with decorative geometric metalwork admit exterior light into some of the courtrooms. A covered patio with brick flooring, planted containers, chairs, and tables provides a transitional space between indoor and outdoor areas.

The U.S. General Services Administration sought to add local context to the site during renovations completed in 2000. Most notably, O'Doherty Group Landscape Architecture redesigned the formerly stark brick plaza to include engaging design features that provide a human scale. Drawing inspiration from Baltimore's past, the landscape architects chose to celebrate the city's mill history, installing a water feature that invokes weirs (dams) and mill races, culminating in a semi-circular fountain base. Designers introduced terraced grassy lawn panels and indigenous plantings. Tiered stone retaining walls of varying lengths are constructed of reclaimed Belgian block from the city's streets and respond to the natural site topography. Unique pyramidal bollards add visual interest to the site while providing security for the building.

Baltimore Federal, a large-scale sculpture by noted artist George Sugarman, was originally installed just outside the building's entrance in 1978. The brightly colored organic forms, executed in painted aluminum, create areas for seating and shelter. The sculpture was initially controversial. [4,5,6,] When the plaza was renovated in 2000, the work was conserved and relocated to its present site at the corner of South Hanover and West Lombard streets. Baltimore-born sculptor Reuben Kramer's rugged bronze depiction of Thurgood Marshall, accomplished lawyer, civil rights advocate, and the first African-American Supreme Court Justice, was unveiled in 1980. It is located on the corner of West Pratt Street and Hopkins Place.

== Significant events ==
- 1972: Building named to honor Edward A. Garmatz
- 1973: Construction commences
- 1976: Construction completed
- 1978: Building dedication ceremony held
- 2000: Plaza renovations completed
- 2004: Former Baltimore Police Commissioner Edward T. Norris pleads guilty to charges

== Building facts ==
- Location: 101 West Lombard Street
- Architect: RTKL Associates
- Construction dates: 1973–1976 ( Major builder: Baltimore Contractors)
- Architectural style: Seventies Modern
- Primary materials: concrete and glass
- Prominent features: horizontal emphasis; landscaped plaza; Baltimore Federal sculpture
- Plaza renovation designed by O'Doherty Group Landscape Architecture

== See also ==
- List of United States federal courthouses in Maryland

== Attribution/References ==
- 1 Fisk, Carleton (May 30, 1971) "New Federal Court Center Speeded", ('Csobaji, Jakmauh and Lamb deliver the Garmatz Federal Courthouse under the new GSA expedited program'), The Baltimore Sun.
- 2 Marlin, William (December 1978) "Federal Architecture: Why not the best?" Architectural Record, pages 83–87; Garmatz Federal Building, Baltimore, Md.
- 3 Dorsey, John; Dilts James, D. (1981) "A Guide to Baltimore Architecture" 1st edition, Garmatz Federal Courthouse, 101 West Lombard Street, RTKL Associates, pages 65,66. ISBN 0-87033-272-4, Tidewater Publishers, Centerville, Md.
- 4 Stanton, Phoebe (May 16, 1976) "Judgement and the Arts: Experts views on Sugarman's work "The Baltimore Sun, Sunday, pages 1 and 3.
- 5 Forge, Andrew (May 1, 1978) Dean of the School of Art, Yale, GSA Art in Architecture Program, March 1, 1979, page 28. GSA 46 page booklet. www.gsa.gov/real-estate/design-constructioin/art-in-architecture-program.
- 6 Smith, Roberta, (August 11, 1999) "George Sugarman, A sculptor of colorful works, Dies at 87" The New York Times, page A19, Garmatz: "Baltimore Federal"
