= Public Safety Building (Montgomery) =

State government building in Montgomery, Alabama

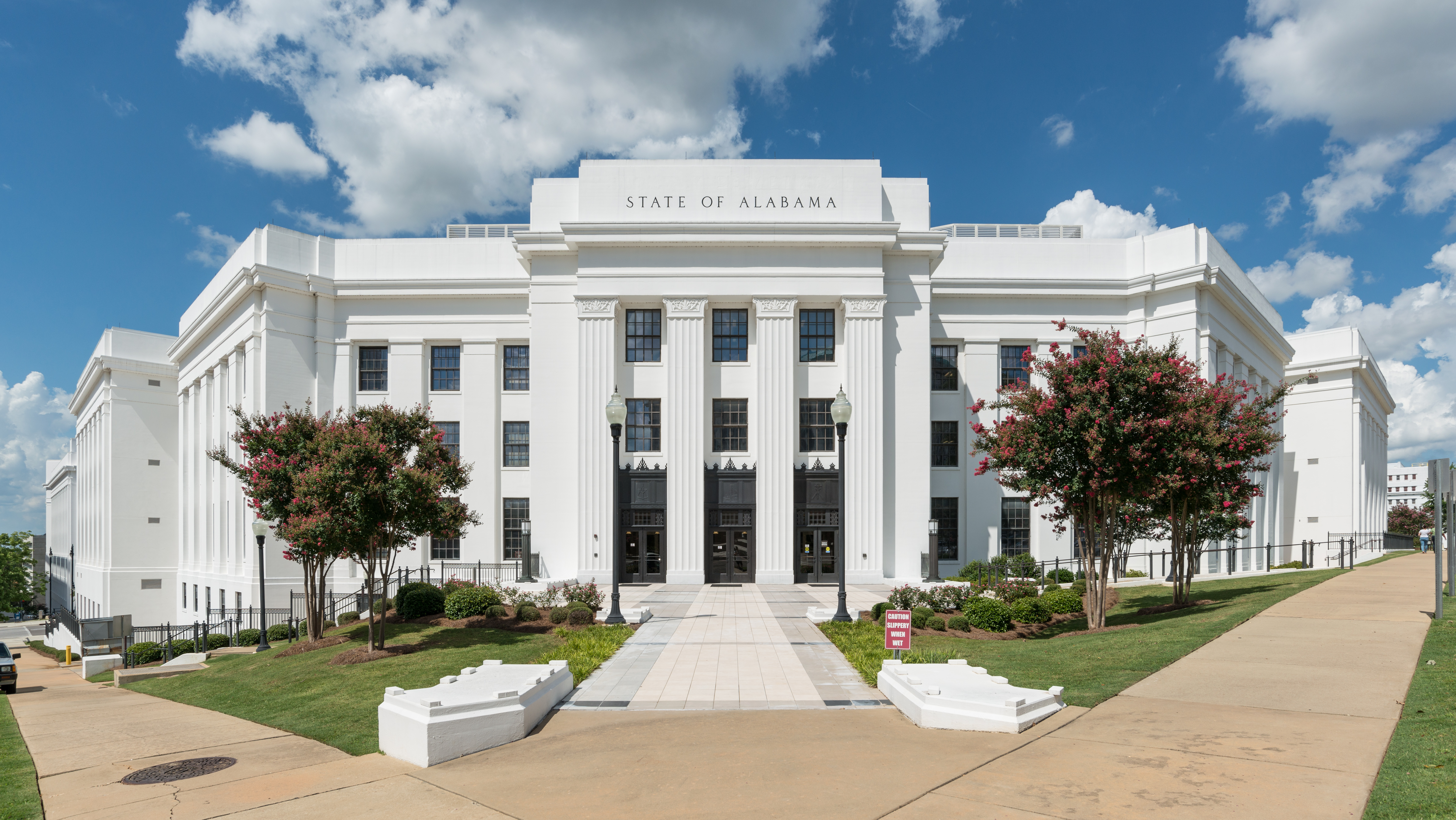
- A southwest view of the Public Safety Building in 2016
- Interactive map of the Public Safety Building area

General information
- Type: Office of the Alabama Attorney General and their staff
- Location: 500 Dexter Avenue, Montgomery, Alabama, United States
- Coordinates: 32°22′37″N 86°18′7″W
- Completed: 1937

Design and construction
- Architecture firm: Warren, Knight, and Davis
- Main contractor: H. H. Houk

Public Safety Building, also known as the Attorney General Building and previously as State Highway Building, is a state government building in Montgomery, Alabama that houses a number of Alabama state executive agencies, including the Office of Attorney General.

The building is located at 500 Dexter Avenue. The design was created by the Birmingham architecture firm Warren, Knight, and Davis. The construction was funded by the Works Progress Administration and overseen by H. H. Houk.

After completion in 1937, the building was occupied by the Alabama Highway Department (hence the name State Highway Building), which was rapidly expanding the highway network in Alabama throughout the New Deal era. Besides, the building housed the State Highway Patrol. As time went by, the building proved inadequate for the needs of the agency so the AHD moved to a new headquarters in what is now Alabama State House, with a number of public safety and law enforcement agencies replacing it at 500 Dexter Avenue.

The building underwent renovations in 2007, which expanded its floor area to 115,648 sq ft across five floors and allowed it to house the Office of Alabama Attorney General. According to a 2008 commemorative plaque, the overhaul was commissioned by the Alabama Building Renovation Authority following the designs by the Seay, Seay & Litchfield architecture firm.

In April 2026 it was announced the building was to be renamed in honor of the current governor Kay Ivey.
