= Public Safety Building (Cumberland, Maryland) =

Historic building in Maryland, USA

- U.S. National Register of Historic Places
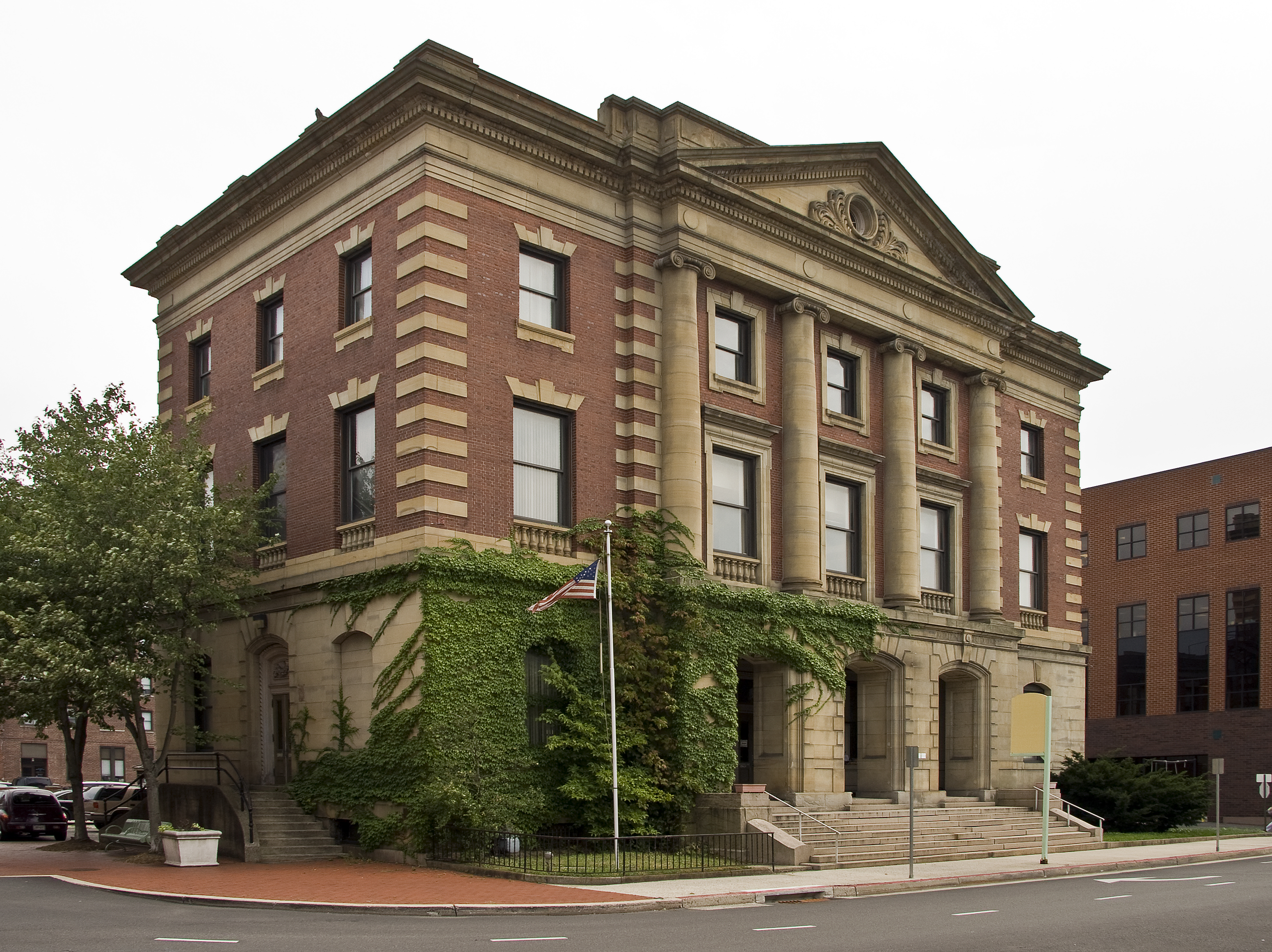

- Location within Maryland Location within the United States
- Location: Frederick and Liberty Sts., Cumberland, Maryland
- Coordinates: 39°39′8″N 78°45′46″W
- Area: 0.5 acres (0.20 ha)
- Built: 1902
- Architect: James Knox Taylor
- Architectural style: Georgian Revival
- NRHP reference No.: 73000883
- Added to NRHP: April 13, 1973

Public Safety Building, or Old Post Office, is a historic building in Cumberland, Allegany County, Maryland. It was constructed between 1902 and 1904, in the Classical Revival style. It is built of brick, rising from a monumental stone base. There is a slightly projecting pavilion with four engaged Ionic columns on the second and third floors. The building was built originally as the United States Courthouse and Post Office during the tenure of James Knox Taylor (1857-1929), who was Supervising Architect for the U.S. Treasury. It served as a courthouse of the United States District Court for the District of Maryland from 1904 to 1933. It is considered to be typical of buildings constructed during Taylor's tenure to the specifications of the Tarsney Act, which required competition in the design of federal buildings.

The building was listed on the National Register of Historic Places in 1973.
