= Edward Garmatz =

American politician (1903–1986)

Edward Alexander Garmatz
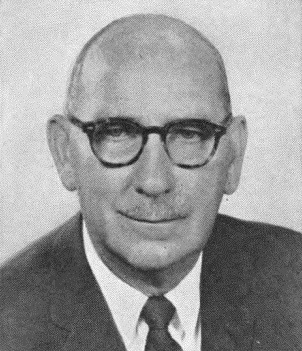

Member of the U.S. House of Representatives from Maryland's 3rd district
- In office July 15, 1947 – January 3, 1973
- Preceded by: Thomas D'Alesandro Jr.
- Succeeded by: Paul Sarbanes

Chairman of the United States House Committee on Merchant Marine and Fisheries
- In office 1965–1973
- Preceded by: Herbert Covington Bonner
- Succeeded by: Leonor Sullivan

Personal details
- Born: February 7, 1903 Baltimore, Maryland, U.S.
- Died: July 22, 1986 (aged 83) Baltimore, Maryland, U.S.
- Party: Democratic

Edward Alexander Garmatz (February 7, 1903 – July 22, 1986), a Democrat, was a U.S. Congressman who represented the 3rd congressional district of Maryland from 1947 to 1973.

== Early life and career ==
Born in Baltimore, Maryland; his father and maternal grandparents were German immigrants. Garmatz attended the public schools, including the Baltimore Polytechnic Institute. He engaged in the electrical business from 1920 to 1942, and was associated with the Maryland State Racing Commission from 1941 to 1944. He served as police magistrate from 1944 to 1947.

== Congressional Tenure ==
Garmatz was elected July 15, 1947, by special election to fill the vacancy left by Thomas D'Alesandro Jr., who had resigned the seat to become Mayor of Baltimore. He was re-elected to the twelve succeeding Congresses and served from July 15, 1947, to January 3, 1973. His retirement was prompted by redistricting which placed him in the same district with Paul Sarbanes. From the Eighty-ninth through the Ninety-second Congresses, Garmatz served as chairman of the Committee on Merchant Marine and Fisheries. A guardian of the U.S. maritime industry, he prevented the Johnson Administration from moving the Maritime Administration into the newly created Department of Transportation.

Garmatz did not sign the 1956 Southern Manifesto, and voted in favor of the Civil Rights Acts of 1957, 1960, 1964, and 1968, as well as the 24th Amendment to the U.S. Constitution and the Voting Rights Act of 1965. During his time in Congress, Garmatz amassed a mainly liberal voting record. But Garmatz did not support the civil rights bill in 1966, apparently because of its open housing provision, and he was an opponent of school busing for integration.

== Retirement ==
He was not a candidate for reelection in 1972 to the Ninety-third Congress, and became employed by the International Organization of Masters, Mates, and Pilots Union. He was a resident of Baltimore until his death there.

In 1978, a federal bribery conspiracy case against Garmatz was dismissed at the urging of Justice Department officials who said they had discovered that their key witness had lied to a grand jury and forged documents. This information was brought to their attention through the investigation of Garmatz's attorney, Arnold M. Weiner.

The federal courthouse in Baltimore is named after Garmatz. After his acquittal, Garmatz stood before the courthouse that bears his name, took out his handkerchief and began wiping the courthouse sign. When asked what he was doing he replied that he was wiping the tarnish from his name.

U.S. House of Representatives
Preceded by Thomas D'Alesandro Jr.	Member of the U.S. House of Representatives from Maryland's 3rd congressional district 1947–1973	Succeeded by Paul Sarbanes
Political offices
Preceded by Herbert C. Bonner; North Carolina	Chairman of House Merchant Marine and Fisheries Committee; 1966–1973	Succeeded by Leonor K. Sullivan; Missouri
