= John Paterakis =

American businessman (1929–2016)

- Born: March 2, 1929
- Died: October 16, 2016 (aged 87); Baltimore, Maryland, US
- Education: Patterson Park High School
- Occupation: Businessman
- Spouse(s): Antoinette Paterakis; Roula Paterakis
- Children: 6

John Paterakis (March 2, 1929 – October 16, 2016) was an American businessman, and the founder and principal owner of H&S Bakery in Baltimore, Maryland.

He was born on March 2, 1929, the son of Steve Paterakis and his wife Kyriaki.

Paterakis graduated from Patterson Park High School in 1947.

He was married to Antoinette Paterakis for 40 years, and then to Roula Paterakis.

He had four sons, Bill who is the CEO, Steve, Chuck and John Jr, all of whom work for H&S. One daughter, Venice K. "Vanessa", is the company dentist, and the other, Karen, is married to the H&S's chief legal counsel. Vanessa is married to former dentist and Sinclair executive Frederick G. Smith (son of Julian Sinclair Smith), whose family owns Sinclair Broadcast Group.

He died on October 16, 2016, at Johns Hopkins Hospital due to complications from bone marrow disease.
