= Philipp Wilhelm von Schoeller =

German-Austrian entrepreneur

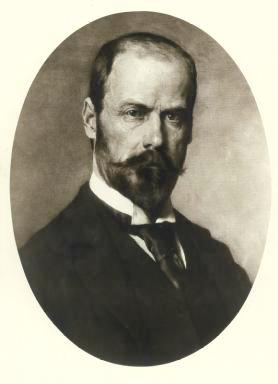
Portrait of Philipp Wilhelm von Schoeller

Philipp Wilhelm von Schoeller (18 April 1845 – 20 February 1916), was a German-Austrian entrepreneur and banker as well as an art photographer.

== Early life ==
Schoeller was born on 18 April 1845 in Vienna into the Schoeller family. He was the son of the merchant Johann Paul von Schoeller (1808–1882), who was born in Düren, worked in Vienna, and was ennobled in 1867, and his wife Pauline Schoeller (1812–1877), the daughter of Johann Peter Schoeller, a Düren cloth manufacturer and brother of Leopold Schoeller.

== Career ==
After receiving his education, Schoeller, his brother, Paul Eduard von Schoeller, and their cousin, Gustav Adolph von Schoeller, were involved in the various companies owned by their uncle, Alexander von Schoeller, in Vienna at an early age. After Alexander's death in 1886, and the death of his cousin Gustav Adolph just three years later, Philipp Wilhelm and Paul Eduard were appointed sole heirs to the company empire in 1889, which included the wholesale and banking house Schoeller & Co. in Vienna (which later became the Schoellerbank), shares in the Berndorfer Metal Goods Factory, the Ternitzer Steel and Iron Works (which later became the Schoeller-Bleckmann Steelworks), as well as agricultural estates and the associated factories for the production of sugar, bread and beer.

=== Political career ===
Schoeller was also active in politics and, in 1895, was elected a lifelong member of the House of Lords of the Imperial Council of Austria as a representative of the moderately liberal Constitutional Party.

=== Photography career ===
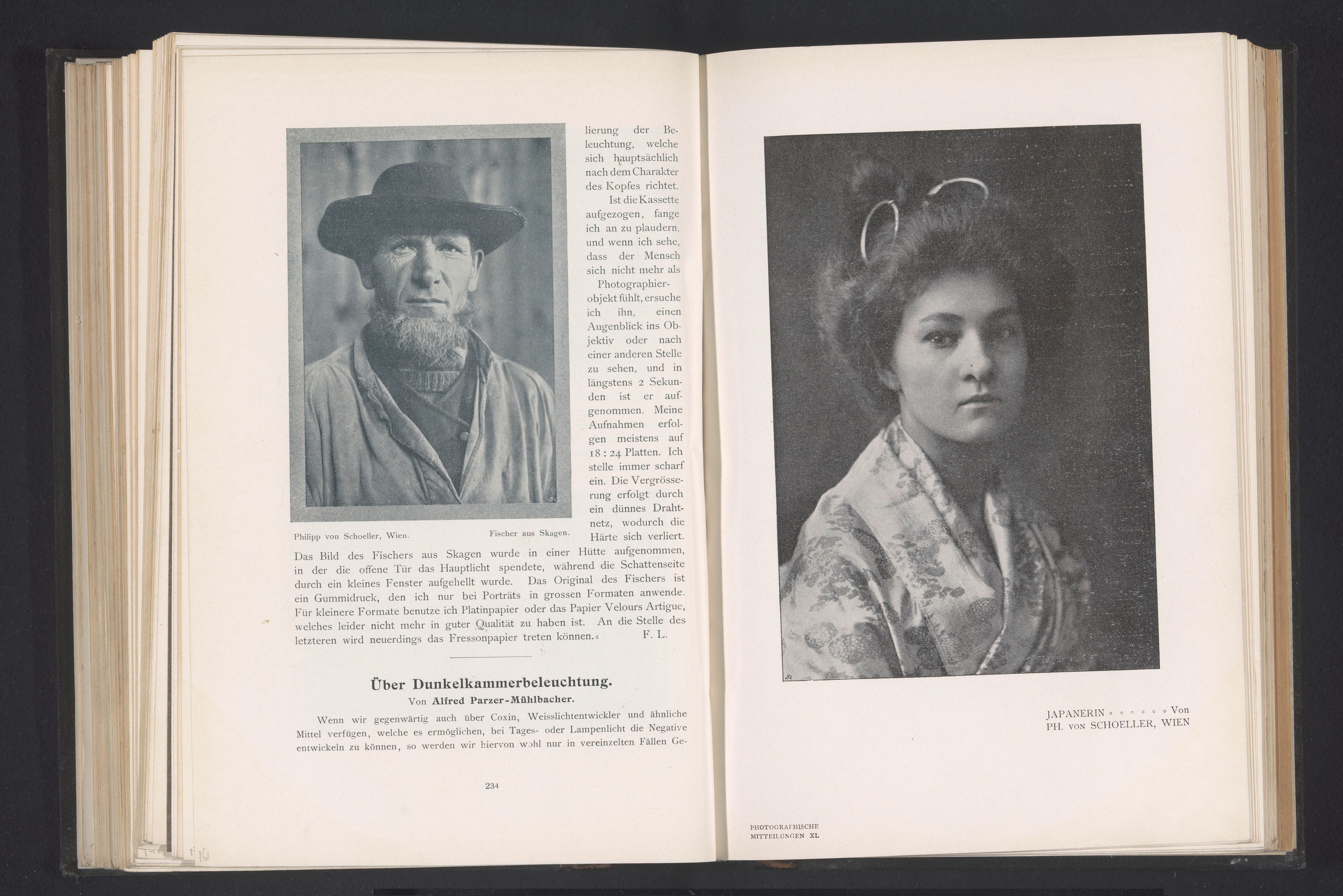
Photographs by Schoeller, c. 1898, in the Rijksmuseum

Schoeller's greatest passion was photography. He took lessons from the photographers Wilhelm Burger and Hans Lenhard and, in 1893, joined both the Vienna Camera Club (German: Wiener Camera-Klub), of which he took over the presidency two years later, and the Photographic Society in Vienna, where he was made an honorary member in 1907. To share his passion for photography with others, Schoeller founded a scholarship that enabled talented, but poor, students to receive training at the Imperial and Royal Teaching and Research Institute for Photography and Reproduction Processes in Vienna.

== Personal life ==
Schoeller died, unmarried and without issue, on 20 February 1916 in Gries-San Quirino, Bolzano, Italy.
