= Paul Eduard von Schoeller =

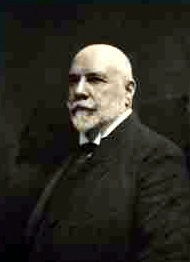
Paul Eduard von Schoeller

Sir Paul Eduard von Schoeller (15 June 1853 - 2 November 1920) was an Austrian mining industrialist.

== Early life ==
Schoeller was born on 15 June 1853 in Vienna. He came from the Viennese line of the Schoeller family and was the son of the merchant Johann Paul von Schoeller (1808–1882), who was born in Düren and worked in Vienna, and was ennobled in 1867, and his wife Pauline (née Schoeller) Schoeller (1812–1877). His maternal grandfather was Düren cloth manufacturer Johann Peter Schoeller, a brother of Leopold Schoeller and thus a distant cousin.

== Career ==
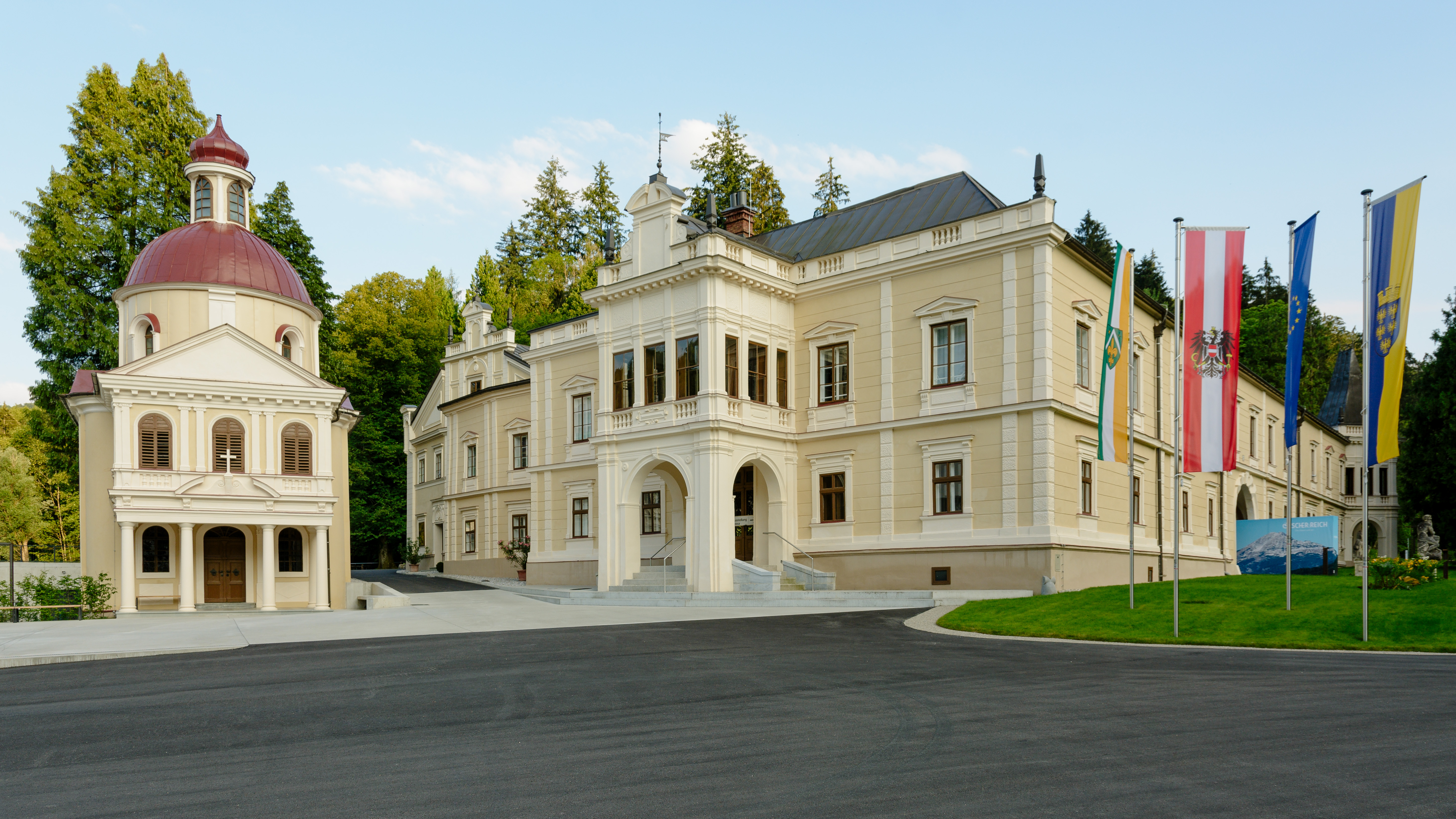
Töpper Castle, Neubruck – family property from 1915 to 1949

After studying in Vienna, Leipzig and at the Federal Polytechnic Institute in Zurich, he and his brother, Philipp Wilhelm von Schoeller, were trained in various companies owned by his uncle Alexander von Schoeller. Soon afterwards, he was commissioned by his uncle to take over and restructure the rolled barley factory he had founded in 1853 in Ebenfurth near Vienna, the Schoeller'sche Dampfmühle, which had run into financial problems as a result of Hungarian competition. In 1894, he also bought the First Vienna Rolling Mill Vonwiller. During his time in Ebenfurth, Schoeller also played a key role in the construction of a new private railway for freight traffic from Ebenfurth to Wittmansdorf with a connection to Leobersdorf.

After having worked for the wholesale company Schoeller & Co. (which later became Schoellerbank) in Vienna for a long time, Schoeller became a partner in 1883. After the death of his uncle Alexander in 1886, and the death of his cousin Gustav Adolph von Schoeller, just three years later, he and his brother Philipp Wilhelm initially became the sole heirs of the entire company empire. However, as his brother soon withdrew more and more from the operational business, Paul Eduard took over sole management of the company.

=== Steel industry ===
In order to concentrate on just one steel company, Schoeller sold both his one-third share in the Berndorf Metal Goods Factory, and that of his deceased cousin, Gustav Adolph, in a swap deal to the third shareholder, Arthur Krupp, who thereby became sole owner. In return, he received Krupp's shares in the Ternitzer Steel and Iron Works from Schoeller & Co., making that the entire company family owned. After Gustav Adolph had already begun modernisation measures at the Ternitzer plant in his final years and had also founded an independent shell factory to produce war material, Paul Eduard pushed ahead with expansion. He replaced the previous mechanical use of hydropower with a modern turbine-driven power plant and swapped the outdated Bessemer process for the new Siemens-Martin process. This enabled his steel types to establish themselves on the world market and the associated ammunition factory also became a major supplier of large-caliber grenades and other armaments for World War I. Under Paul Eduard's leadership, the family business reached its greatest economic expansion. He appointed his cousin from the Brno branch of the family, Richard von Schoeller, as manager of the main plant in Ternitz, which later, in 1924, merged with the Bleckmann steelworks to form Schoeller-Bleckmann Steelworks.

=== Diplomatic career ===
Schoeller also represented the interests of the United Kingdom of Great Britain and Ireland as Consul General in Vienna from 1892 to 1912. For his services, he was made a Knight Bachelor in 1912. Furthermore, in 1902, due to his political commitment to the Liberal Constitutional Party in Austria, he was appointed a lifelong member of the House of Lords of the Imperial Council of Austria.

== Personal life ==
Schoeller died, without issue, on 2 November 1920 in Vienna and was buried in the Grinzing Cemetery. After his death in 1920, his cousin Richard von Schoeller became the sole heir to the family empire. Another cousin, Robert von Schoeller, succeeded him as director of the Leipnik-Lundenburg Sugar Factory. His nephew and adopted son, Gustav Neufeldt (son of his sister Emma and the Lüdenscheid wholesaler and Norwegian consul in Vienna Karl Neufeldt), inherited his palace in Vienna and received his noble title and name in 1911. Since then, the surviving descendants have called themselves Neufeldt-Schoeller.

=== Honors ===
For his services, Schoeller was awarded the Commander's Cross in 1898 and the Grand Cross of the Order of Franz Joseph in 1905, and was appointed Privy Councillor in 1918.
