= Alexander von Schoeller =

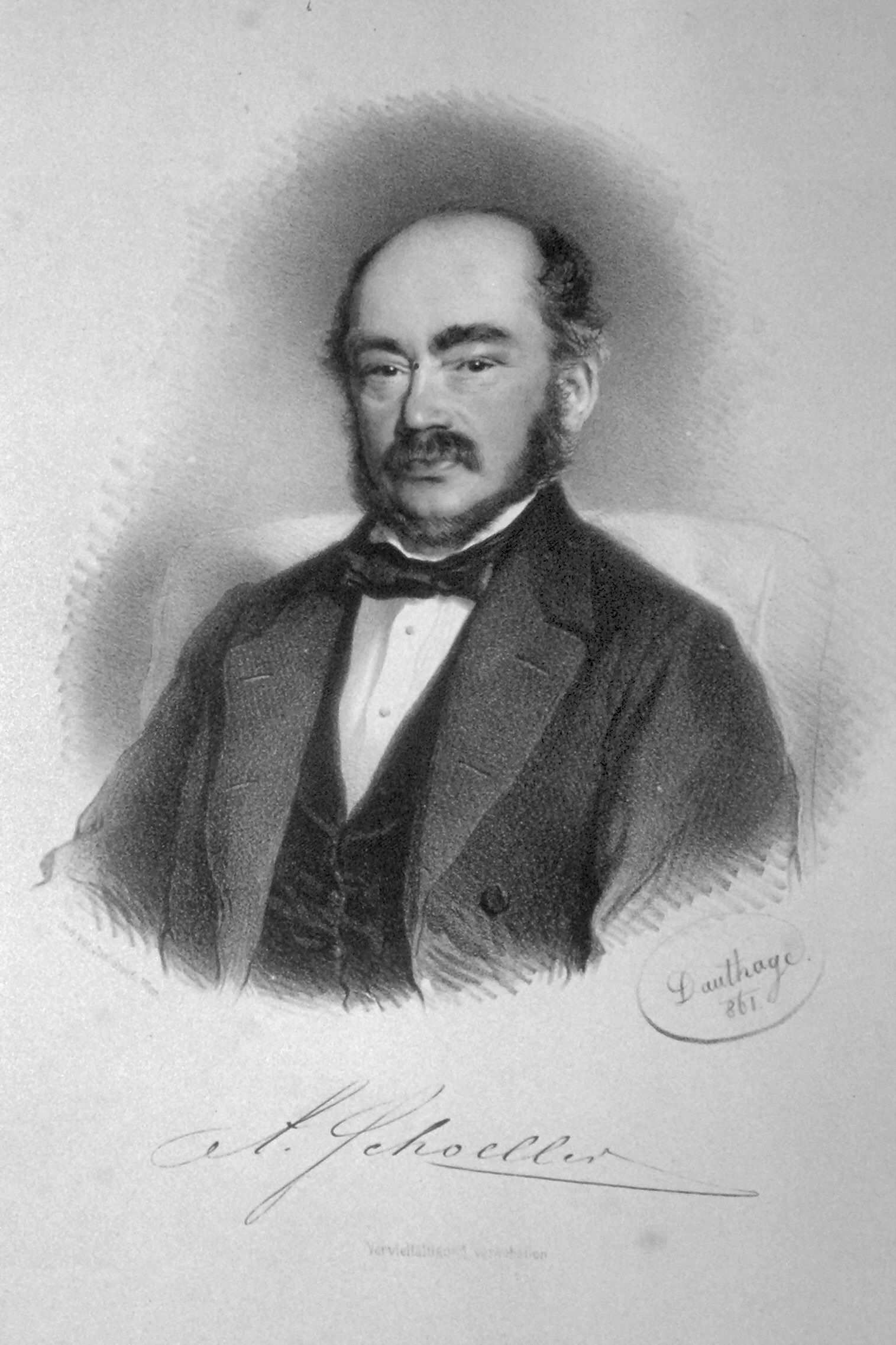
Lithograph of Alexander von Schoeller by Adolf Dauthage, 1866

Wilhelm Alexander Ritter von Schoeller (né Wilhelm Alexander Schoeller; 12 June 1805 – 11 November 1886) was a German-Austrian industrialist, entrepreneur and banker.

== Early life ==
Schoeller was born on 12 June 1805 in Düren in North Rhine-Westphalia into the prominent Schoeller family. He was the son of the cloth manufacturer Johann Paul Schoeller (1772–1845) and Elisabeth Henriette Wilhelmine Eickel.

He completed a commercial apprenticeship in his father's factory and from 1825 gained practical experience in trade in the Schoeller Brothers Fine Cloth and Woolen Factory in Brno, which was run by his cousin, Philipp Wilhelm von Schoeller (born 1797).

== Career ==
Schoeller was given responsibility for the Vienna branch in 1831. In 1833, Schoeller founded his own wholesale company "Schoeller & Co." in Vienna, from which trade in goods from the various family businesses and also from future industrial connections was centrally controlled. He later brought his brother, Johann Paul von Schoeller (1808–1882), who was ennobled in 1867, into the company. Schoeller expanded his trading house to include a banking division, which eventually developed into today's Schoellerbank.

=== Collaboration with Krupp ===
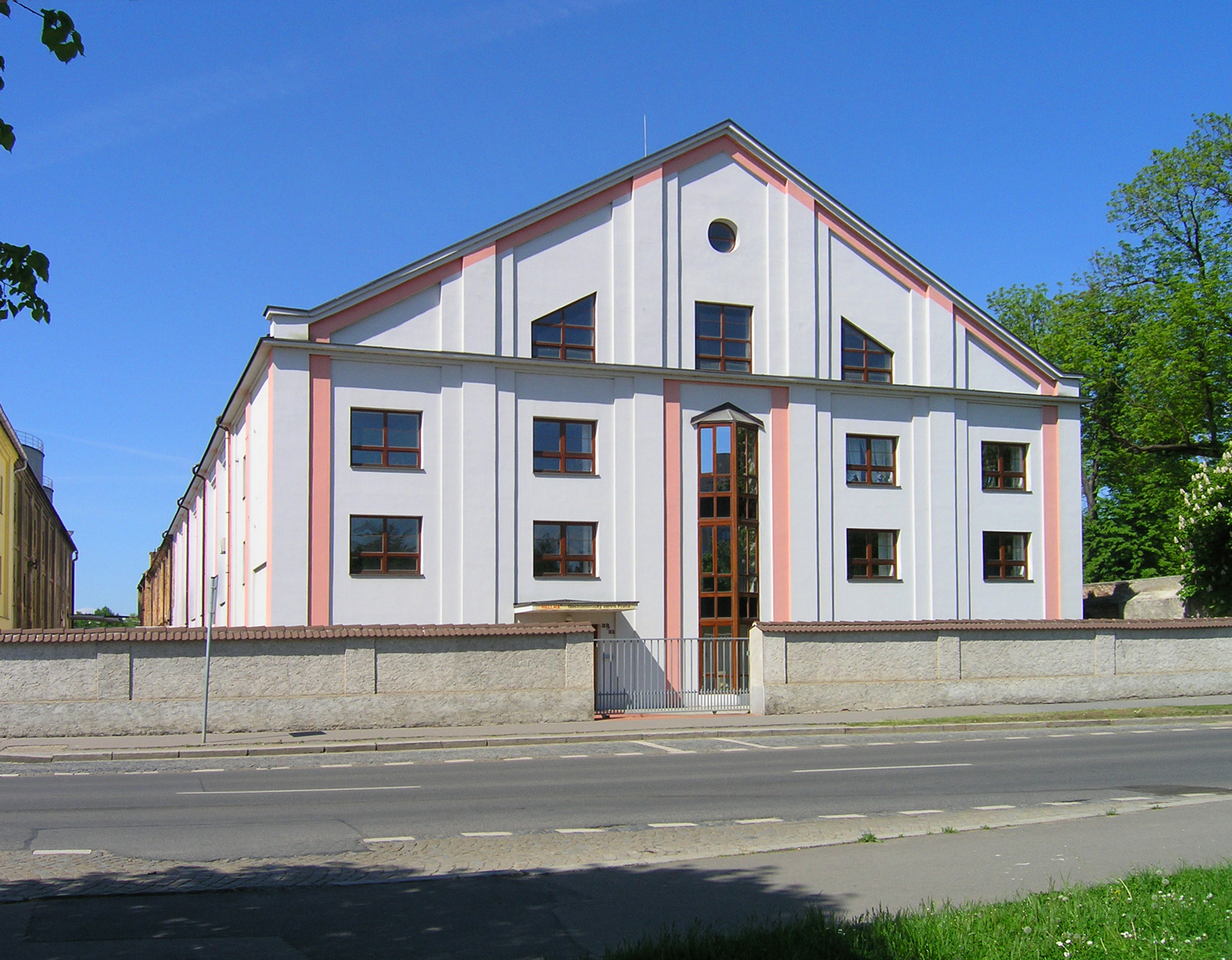
Former Sugar Refinery, Prague Čakovice

In 1843, Schoeller founded the Berndorfer metal goods factory for fine table cutlery together with Alfred Krupp as a silent partner. In 1862 he took over the Ternitzer Eisenwerke Reichenbach together with Alfred Krupp, which he converted into the Ternitzer Steel and Iron Works in 1868 together with Alfred's brother Hermann Krupp, which then merged with the Bleckmann steelworks in Mürzzuschlag in 1924 to form the Schoeller-Bleckmann Steelworks. In order to secure access to raw material sources for his companies, he acquired holdings in the coal mines in Miesbach and Jaworzno, among others, and founded the Mirošov (Rokycany) hard coal union together with Ernst von Herring and his nephew Gustav Adolph von Schoeller.

=== Sugar industry ===
Like his second brother, Heinrich Eduard von Schoeller, who was also ennobled in 1867 in Edelény in Hungary, Alexander opened up another line of business for himself by entering the food industry, particularly the sugar industry. To do this, he acquired agricultural estates for sugar beet cultivation in places such as Čakovice, Ctěnice and Miškovice, all near Prague. Together with his cousin from Brno, Philipp Wilhelm, he acquired shares in several sugar factories there. In 1856, he founded a sugar refinery in Vrdy. In 1867, he founded another sugar refinery in Leipnik with his relatives, by marriage, from the Skene family.

=== Agricultural enterprises and estates ===
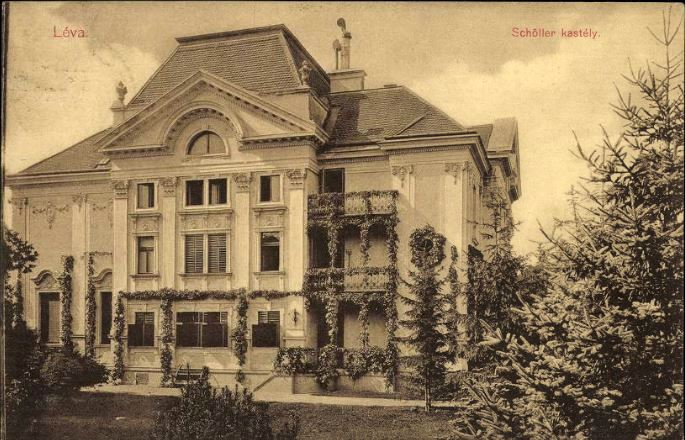
Levice Castle

Schoeller also founded a rolled barley factory in Ebenfurth near Vienna, which he built up into the largest milling operation in the monarchy, and he also acquired a share in the Hütteldorfer Brewery. With Carl Leidenfrost von Bars, he leased the Levice estate in Upper Hungary (known as Slovakia since 1918), which became the property of his Viennese trading house and which later, under the management of his Brno nephew Gustav von Schoeller and his son Gustav Philipp, became a model company for half-blood breeding and schnapps distillery. In 1867, Alexander also purchased Levice Castle from the Esterházy family as a family seat, which, like the Levice estate itself, remained in the family until it was expropriated in 1945 under the Beneš decrees.

In 1848, Alexander von Schoeller acquired Stenitz Castle, near Prague, from Aloisia, Countess Desfours, as his family residence. It remained in the family until it was expropriated in 1945 due to the Beneš decrees.

=== Awards and ennoblement ===
For his services, Schoeller was appointed Imperial Councillor and was ennobled in the hereditary Austrian nobility with the rank of Ritter in 1868 and awarded the Order of the Iron Crown, Third Class. From then on, Schoeller was therefore a member of the House of Lords of the Imperial Council of Austria.

== Personal life ==
Schoeller was married to Pauline Hoesch (1814–1881), the sister of Leopold Hoesch, who lived with them while studying at the Polytechnic School in Vienna. They were children of Wilhelm Hoesch and Johanna (née Schoeller) Hoesch (a sister of Alexander's uncle Leopold Schoeller from Düren). After Pauline's death in 1881, he married Pauline Hendeß von Cöslin (1837–1921) in Vienna.

Schoeller died 11 November 1886 in Vienna. Since both marriages remained childless, Alexander's primary enterprise, the Viennese trading and banking house Schoeller & Co., as well as most of his industrial branches, passed into the ownership of his three nephews, Gustav Adolph von Schoeller (1826–1889), Philipp Wilhelm von Schoeller and Sir Paul Eduard von Schoeller.
