= Schoeller family =

German noble family

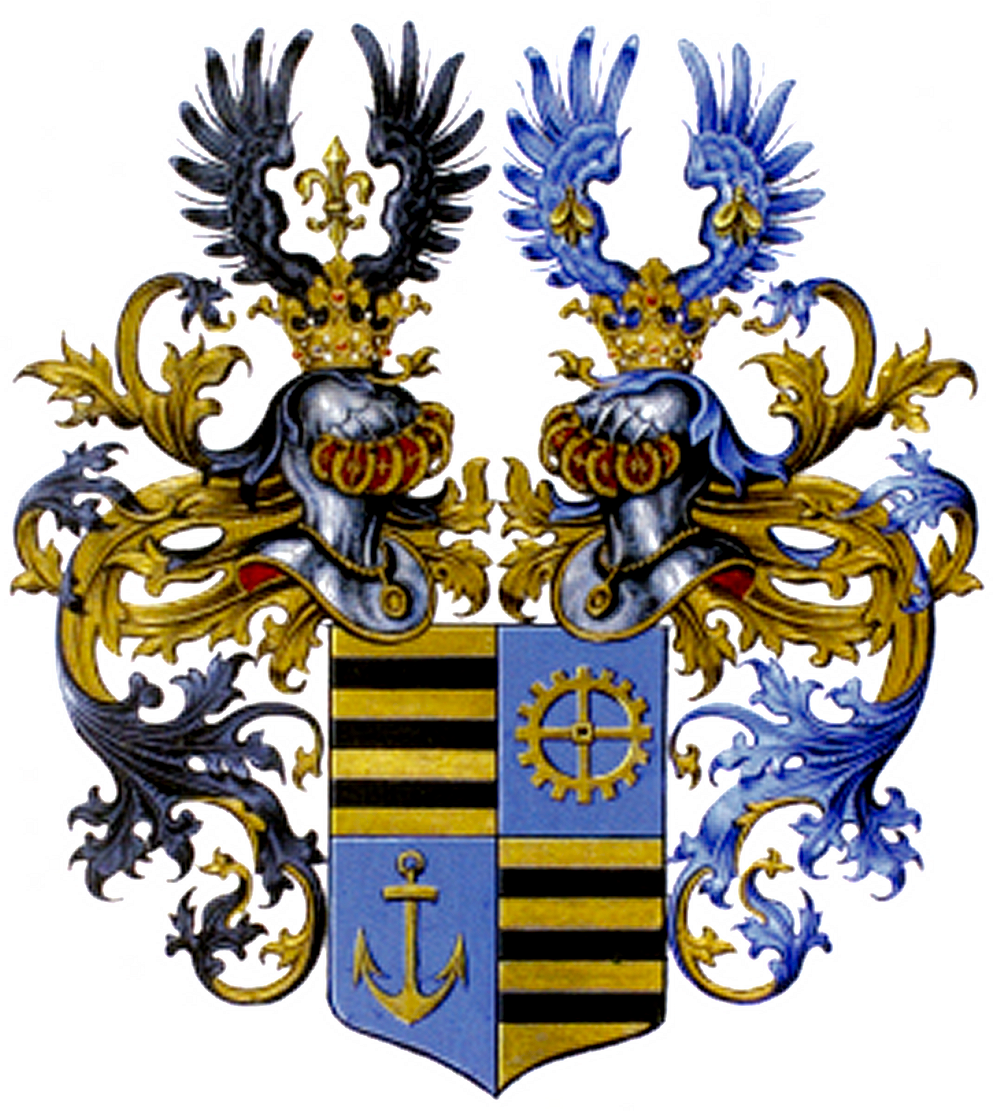
Schoeller coat of arms

The Schoeller (Note: In older documents the family name is also written as: Scolere, Scollere, Scholer, Scholere, and Schoeler, although the spelling with "oe" has been retained throughout all lines with few exceptions.) family is a German noble family. Originally from the Rhineland, the family has retained long-held and extensive business holdings throughout Europe for many generations.

== History ==
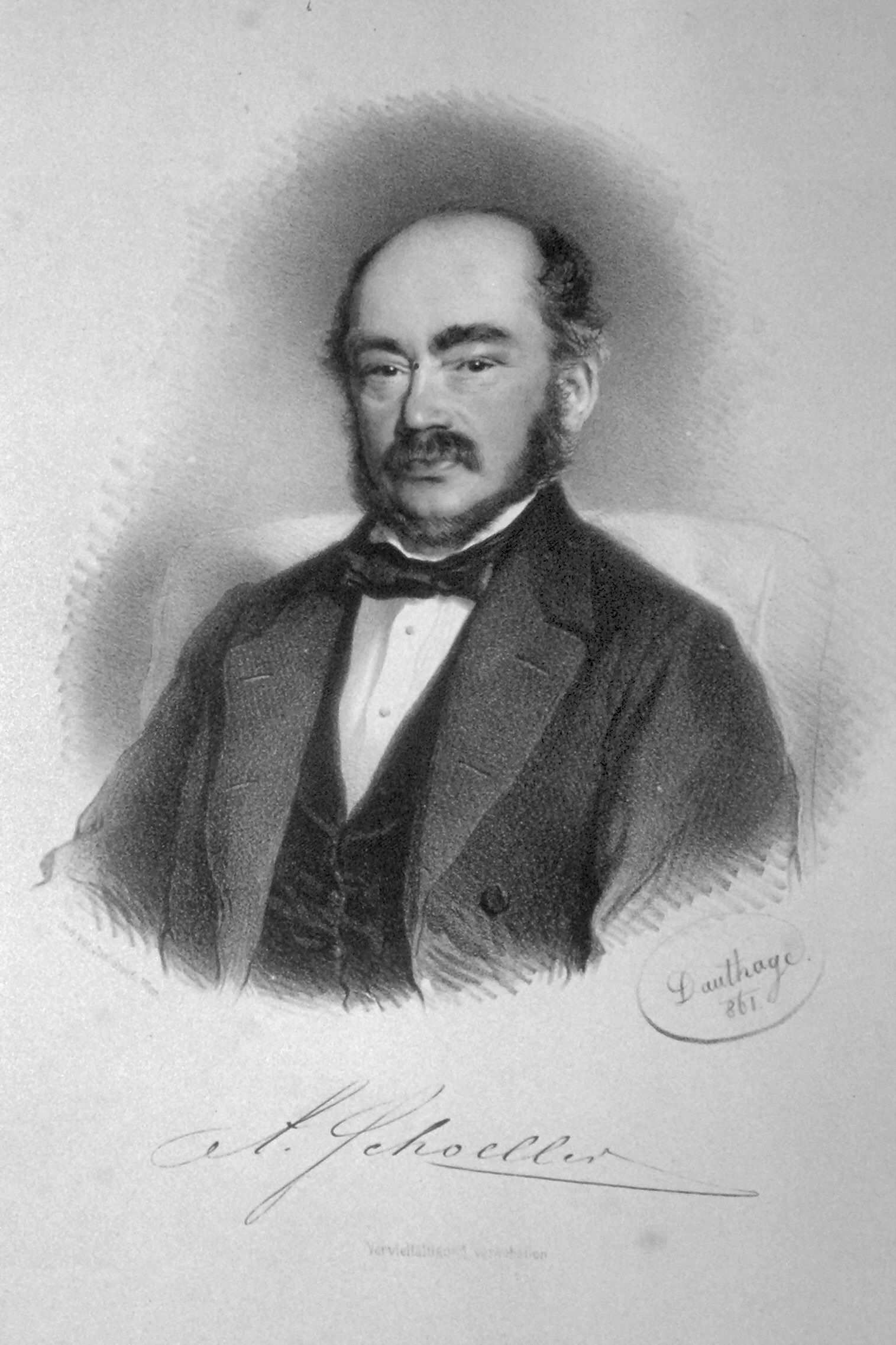
Lithograph of Alexander von Schoeller by Adolf Dauthage, 1866

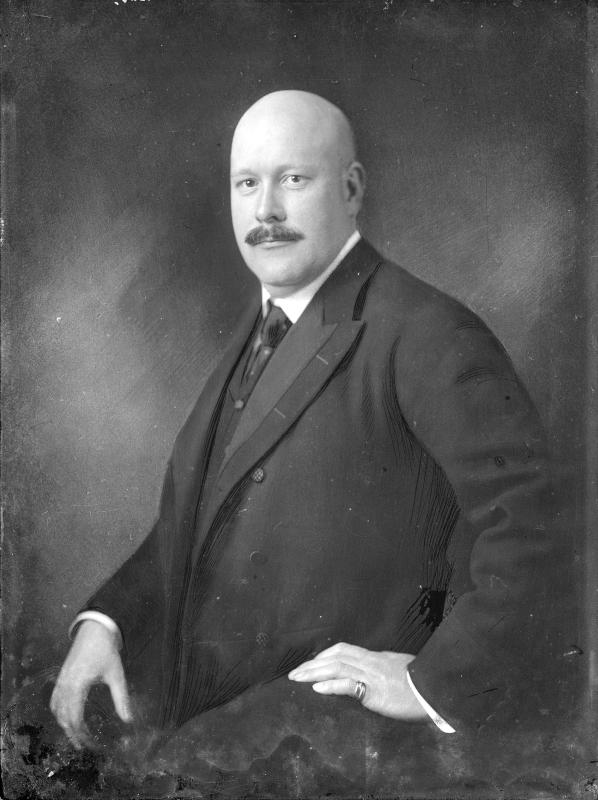
Richard von Schoeller, c. 1920

While most members of the family initially worked as Reidemeister (metal manufacturers) in the Eifel, beginning in the 18th century, they became founders, shareholders and managers of numerous companies in the textile, paper, sugar and steel industries as well as in packaging technology. They also formed Schoellerbank, a trading and banking house in Vienna which was founded initially as a wholesaler in 1833. They were also involved in the coal mining industry, in the construction and railway industry, in breweries and with other banking and trading houses. In addition to their original home towns of Schleiden, Gemünd and Hellenthal in the Eifel, their companies were primarily located in the Düren-Jülich area, the towns of Eitorf, Osnabrück as well as Wrocław, Edelény, Prague, Brno, Zurich, Bregenz, Ternitz, Berndorf, Vienna and other locations worldwide.

A large number of family members are still active in public or political offices, holding appointments as city councillors, as members of the Prussian House of Representatives or the House of Lords of the Imperial Council of Austria, as board members in chambers of commerce and industry, as honorary consuls, or as members of numerous supervisory and administrative boards as well as company boards.

Several members of the "Brno" and "Vienna branches" were elevated to the hereditary Austrian nobility in 1863 with the title of Knight, and Sir Paul Eduard von Schoeller was elevated to the British nobility as Knight Bachelor. However, in 1919, all living family members and their descendants were required to remove the additions Ritter and von from their names if they had accepted citizenship in the Republic of Austria, due to the Law on the Abolition of Nobility of April 1919.

== Prominent members ==
- Alexander von Schoeller (1805–1886), mining industrialist and banker in Berndorf, Ternitz and Vienna, lifelong member of the Austrian House of Lords, ennobled in 1863
- Alexander Schoeller (1852–1911), banker and financier of the Rhenish-Westphalian heavy industry, Privy Councillor of the Sea
- Benno Schoeller (1828–1908), paper manufacturer and patron
- Catharina Schenkel, née Schoeller (1774–1852), donor in Düren and founder of the Schenkel-Schoeller welfare institution
- Felix Heinrich Schoeller (1821–1893), paper manufacturer in Düren, co-founder of paper factories in Neu Kaliß, Offingen and Gernsbach, co-founder of the Düren Railway
- Felix Hermann Maria Schoeller (1855–1907), paper manufacturer at Burg Gretesch, specialist for photographic paper
- Franz Jochen Schoeller (1926–2019), former Ambassador
- Gerhard Schoeller (1886–1970), German paper manufacturer and President of the Osnabrück Chamber of Industry and Commerce
- Gustav von Schoeller (1830–1912), major industrialist and economic functionary in Brno, German consul for Moravia and Silesia and consular agent for the US
- Gustav Adolph von Schoeller (1826–1889), mining industrialist, major entrepreneur and banker in Berndorf, Ternitz and Vienna
- Heinrich August Schoeller (1788–1863), paper manufacturer at Schoellershammer
- Heinrich August Schoeller (1923–2021), Düren industrialist
- Hubertus Schoeller (b. 1942), gallery owner in Düsseldorf and art donor in Düren
- Leopold Schoeller (1792–1884), cloth and carpet manufacturer, member of the Prussian Parliament, Privy Councillor of Commerce
- Leopold Schoeller (1830–1896), major industrialist in Breslau, co-initiator of the Oder-Spree Canal, member of the Free Conservative Party in the Prussian House of Representatives
- Max Schoeller (1865–1943), sugar manufacturer and ethnologist
- Sir Paul Eduard von Schoeller (1853–1920), mining industrialist in Ternitz and Vienna, lifelong member of the Austrian House of Lords, British Consul General in Vienna, 1912 British Knight Bachelor, patron of the arts
- Philipp Schöller (1771–1842), Prussian mayor of Düsseldorf
- Philipp von Schoeller (1921–2008), major entrepreneur, Austrian champion in show jumping, representative of Austria from 1977 to 2000 and subsequently honorary member of the International Olympic Committee
- Philipp Johann von Schoeller (1835–1892), major industrialist of the Bohemian sugar industry
- Philipp Wilhelm von Schoeller (born 1797) (1797–1877), major industrialist in the cloth and sugar industry in Brno, Prague and Vienna, member of the Moravian Diet, ennobled in 1863
- Philipp Wilhelm von Schoeller (1845–1916), major industrialist and banker in Vienna, president of the Vienna Camera Club, lifelong member of the Austrian House of Lords
- Richard von Schoeller (1871–1950), major industrialist of the Bohemian sugar industry and mining industrialist in Ternitz and Berndorf
- Robert von Schoeller (1873–1950), major industrialist in the sugar industry in Moravia and Lower Austria, received transfer of nobility from his cousin Richard in 1911
- Rudolf Schoeller (1902–1978), Swiss racing driver
- Rudolf Wilhelm Schoeller (1827–1902), major entrepreneur and head of the Schoeller worsted factories in Bregenz and Zurich, among others; member of the Old Liberals in the Prussian House of Representatives; German consul for Switzerland
- Walter Schoeller (1889–1979), General Director of the Swiss family business Schoeller Switzerland, multiple Swiss national champion in football, rowing, tennis and hockey, European champion in coxed fours and eights, President and Honorary President of the Grasshoppers Club Zurich
- Walter Julius Viktor Schoeller (1880–1965), professor of medicinal chemistry in Freiburg im Breisgau, head of laboratory in Berlin

== Family seats ==
The family owned a number of notable castles, palaces and prominent buildings, including:

Name (native)	Location	Description	Image
Birgel Castle (Burg Birgel)	Birgel (Düren), Germany	In 1840, Heinrich Leopold Schoeller acquired the 13th century moated castle, which he completely renovated, expanded and built a park for. His grandson, Max Schoeller, sold it to Baron von Diergardt in 1913. The complex was converted into a primary school in 1958.	125x125x
Villa Schoeller	Wrocław, Poland	The villa was built in 1905 by Leopold's descendants who worked in Wrocław. Located in the Borek district, the family owned it until their expulsion in 1945. Since 2010, the villa (today known as the "Platinum Palace") has been used as a 5-star hotel.	125x125x
Stenitz Castle (Schloss Stenitz)	Prague, Czech Republic	In 1849, Alexander von Schoeller acquired the castle from the estate of Aloisia, Countess Desfours, also buying the Čakovice and Miškovice estates. The Schoeller family owned the castle for almost a hundred years until they were expropriated in 1945 as a result of the Beneš decrees.	125x125x
Lewenz Castle (Burg Lewenz)	Levice, Slovakia	In 1867, Alexander von Schoeller acquired the castle from the Esterházy family as a family seat. Like the Levice estate itself, the castle remained in the family until 1945.	125x125x
Ratschitz Castle (Schloss Ratschitz)	Račice, Czech Republic	In 1894, Sir Paul Eduard von Schoeller, acquired the castle from Baron von Palm. The castle was also expropriated in 1945.	125x125x
Corbelli-Schoeller Palace (Palais Corbelli-Schoeller)	Vienna, Austria	In c. 1905, Sir Paul Eduard von Schoeller acquired the 17th-century baroque palace, which he had extensively remodelded. As he died unmarried and without issue, he left it to his nephew, and adopted son, Gustav Neufeldt-Schoeller, for whom he managed the transfer his title of nobility in 1911.	125x125x
Schoeller Palace (Palast Schoeller)	Brno, Czech Republic	The palace was built in 1868 by Gustav Adolph von Schoeller as a family home and office in Brno. Designed by architect Joseph Arnold, it was built on the site of a demolished chapel. The palace was also expropriated in 1945.	125x125x
Villa Benker-Schoellerhof (Villa Benker und Schoellerhof)	Offingen, Germany	The villa was acquired by Felix Heinrich Schoeller during his time in Offingen. His grandson, Felix Heribert Schoeller, bought the Gneven estate near Schwerin in 1925, but sold it two years later to his paper factory in Neu Kaliß. In 1945, he bought a 211 hectare area of land near Osnabrück, where he had a manor house and farm built, now called the "Schoellerhof". Schoellerhof remained in the family until 1973, and was converted into an independent foundation by the heirs of the subsequent owners in 2006.	125x125x
Hardturm	Zurich, Switzerland	After Rudolf Wilhelm Schoeller moved his factory from Wrocław to Zurich in 1865, he acquired the area around the Hardturm in Zurich as a new company site and, in 1882, the tower itself as a residence and meeting room. From 1979 onwards, the entire property was incorporated into the real estate and management company "Hardturm AG", which is part of the Schoeller Spinning Group.	125x125x
Schoellergut	Zurich, Switzerland	In 1883, Arthur Schoeller-Ziesing bought the villa and observatory from the naturalist Eduard Kann in the Enge district. In 1934, his son, Friedrich Arthur Schoeller, president of the Swiss Federal Bank, had the villa demolished and the architect Richard von Muralt had the Villa Schoeller built, which remains standing today. The villa and its outbuildings are now used by the Freudenberg and Enge cantonal schools.	125x125x
Villa Liebenstein	Bregenz, Austria	In c. 1910, Arthur Friedrich Schoeller acquired the villa from Ferdinand Brettauer. His son, Rudolf Schoeller, remodeled and expanded the associated park before selling it to Schoeller & Co. in 1953. Since 1982, the villa has belonged to the city of Bregenz, which set up the municipal music school there.	125x125x
Villa Schoeller	Hirschwang an der Rax, Austria	In 1905, the villa was rebuilt for Richard von Schoeller, with designs by Egon von Leutzendorf (who also designed an annex for the Corbelli-Schoeller Palace). Schoeller, who had previously taken over Hirschwang's iron plant, sold the entire iron plant to Neusiedler in 1920. They continued the plant's paper and cardboard production and used the villa to house workers' families.	125x125x

== Family businesses ==
Name (native)	Location	Description	Image
Schoeller Factory (Schoeller Werk)	Hellenthal	Founded in 1827 by Wilhelm Arnold Schoeller, the company was a pioneer of the automatic production of nails and rivets made of wire. After commissioning the first pipe welding lines in 1959 and introducing laser welding technology in 1991, the company now produces over 50,000 tons of stainless steel pipes per year on more than 100 welding lines.	
Schoeller Brothers Fine Cloth and Woolen Factory (Gebrüder Schoeller k.k. Feintuch- und Wollwarenfabrik)	Brno	Founded in 1819 by brothers Johann Peter, Carl Friedrich and Heinrich Leopold Schoeller. In order for the brothers to continue working primarily in their Düren factories, they transferred the company to their nephew, Philipp Wilhelm von Schoeller. The company remained in the family until its expropriation in 1945.	
Schoeller & Co. Wholesale (later Schoellerbank) (Großhandelshaus Schoeller & Co.)	Vienna	Founded in 1833 by Alexander von Schoeller. In 1979, the company became a stock corporation and, in 1989, Schoeller Münzhandel, a numismatics trading company and precious metal investment products, was created through the spin-off of the numismatic division. In 2001 after several mergers, became a wholly owned subsidiary of Bank Austria. Schoeller Münzhandel was acquired by the Austrian Mint in 2005. Until General Director Herbert von Schoeller retired in 1994, Schoeller family descendants were continuously involved in the management of Schoellerbank.	125x125x
Berndorfer Metal Goods Factory (Berndorfer Metallwarenfabrik)	Berndorf	Founded in 1843 by Alexander von Schoeller with Alfred Krupp. From 1891, the company was solely owned by Alfred's nephew, Arthur Krupp. In 1984, it became a subsidiary of Österreichische Industrieholding.	125x125x
Schoeller Steelworks (Schoeller Stahlwerke)	Ternitz	Founded in 1862 by Alexander von Schoeller, it merged with the Bleckmann steelworks in Mürzzuschlag in 1924 to form Schoeller-Bleckmann Stahlwerke. In 1946, these were nationalized and are now also part of the Österreichische Industrieholding. In 1988, Schoeller-Bleckmann Oilfield Equipment, an Austrian manufacturer of high-precision parts for the oilfield service industry, was created through a spin-off and is headquartered in Ternitz.	125x125x
Schoeller Worsted Spinning Mill (later Schoeller Spinning Group) (Schoeller'sche Kammgarnspinnerei)	Wrocław, Eitorf, Bregenz, Zurich	Acquired in 1849 by Heinrich Leopold Schoeller. His son, Rudolf Wilhelm Schoeller, moved the headquarters to Zurich in 1867 and founded additional branches in Bregenz, Zürich West and Sevelen, among others. Factories in Eitorf and Süßen were also added. The Swiss branches merged to form Schoeller Switzerland with headquarters in Sevelen and the entire company was renamed Albers & Co. in 1979. In 2009, as part of a reorganization, individual subsidiaries merged to form the new Schoeller Spinning Group, headquartered in Zurich.	125x125x
Anchor Carpeting (Anker-Teppichboden)	Düren	Founded in 1854 by Heinrich Leopold Schoeller as a carpet office and branch of his cloth factory. Six generations later, the company remains owned by the family and was run by Markus Schoeller until his death in 2015.	125x125x
Schoeller Textiles (Schoeller Textil)	Huchem-Stammeln	Founded in 1889 by Leopold Schoeller as Leopold Schoeller Jr. & Cie. The company, which was one of the leading mills in Germany, remained family-owned for four generations. Production in Huchem-Stammeln was discontinued in 2000 and relocated to Litvínov in the Czech Republic, while the company itself was sold to the Indian Spentex Group. In 2003, Schoeller Industrielogistik was founded at the Huchem-Stammeln site together with STS Transport-Service Schmalkalden to operate a warehouse logistics system at these two sites.	125x125x
Schoellershammer Paper Mill (Papierfabrik Schoellershammer)	Krauthausen	Founded in 1784 by Heinrich Wilhelm Schoeller by converting a former iron hammer mill and merging it with the Schevenmühle owned by Rütger von Scheven. In 1862, brothers Julius and Benno Schoeller built another paper mill known as Neumühle. Neumühle was sold in 1981 to the German paper company Zanders Feinpapiere (itself acquired by International Paper in 1989). In 1991 it was incorporated into the subsidiary Kanzan Spezialpapiere (owned by the Japanese Ōji-Seishi Group since 2000. The old Schoellershammer paper mill, on the other hand, continues to exist as an independent company under the company name Heinrich August Schoeller Söhne.	125x125x
Felix Heinrich Schoeller Paper Mill (Papierfabrik Felix Heinrich Schoeller)	Düren	Founded in 1857 by Felix Heinrich Schoeller. It remained in family ownership until 1965 when it was merged Zanders Reflex. In 2012, the factory was sold to Hahnemühle and has been called Reflex ever since.	125x125x
Felix Schoeller & Bausch Paper Mill (Papierfabrik Felix Schoeller & Bausch)	Neu Kaliß (Mecklenburg)	Acquired in 1872 by Felix Heinrich Schoeller and Theodor Bausch. It was dissolved and dismantled in 1945, then relaunched by Viktor Bausch in 1950.	125x125x
Schoeller & Hoesch Paper Mill (Papierfabrik Schoeller & Hoesch)	Gernsbach	Founded in 1881 by Felix Heinrich Schoeller with Georg Schultz as the cellulose factory Schultz & Cie, focusing on cigarette paper and later tea bag paper production. Schoeller & Hoesch was acquired by the American manufacturer Glatfelter in 1998.	125x125x
Felix Schoeller Group (Felix Schoeller Gruppe)	Osnabrück-Gretesch	Founded in 1895 by Felix Hermann Maria Schoeller when he acquired the Gruner paper factory and specialized in the production of high-quality photographic paper. Until the beginning of the 21st century, Schoeller descendants were managers of the company, which, through numerous acquisitions and mergers, is now known as Felix Schoeller Holding.	125x125x
Schoeller, Peill & Brockhoff (later Zuckerfabrik Düren) (Schoeller, Peill & Brockhoff)	Düren	Founded in 1869 by Heinrich Leopold Schoeller, Leopold Peill, and Julius Brockhoff. From 1890, Leopold Peill was the sole owner and the company was renamed L. Peill & Co. It was not until 1922 that Walter Schoeller, a grandson of Leopold Peill, joined the company again, and he became the sole manager of the company from 1925 onwards. His heirs ran the company until 1987 when it merged into the Cologne-based company Pfeifer & Langen.	125x125x
Zuckerfabrik Alexander Schoeller & Julius Brockhoff (Zuckerfabrik Alexander Schoeller & Julius Brockhoff)	Jülich	Founded in 1880 by Alexander Paul Schoeller and his brother-in-law, Julius Brockhoff. After Schoeller's death, the company was renamed Zuckerfabrik Jülich. It was later taken over by Pfeifer & Langen in 2006 and is the last sugar factory in the Düren district.	125x125x
Ewald Schoeller & Co. (Ewald Schoeller & Co.)	Langerwehe	Founded in 1943 by Ewald Schoeller as a factory for paper products and yarns. In 1966, it switched to the production of plastic containers and plastic films made of polyethylene. After taking over the Alsdorf film manufacturer, Aldo-Plast, the company was renamed Schoeller-Aldo, but split again in 2007 into Aldoplast and Alesco.	125x125x
Schoeller Industries (Schoeller Industries)	Pullach	Founded in 1937 by Alexander Schoeller, initially as a packaging factory. Today, the company focuses on packaging, logistics and recycling. Since 1984, the company has been managed by his sons Martin Alexander Schoeller and Christoph Schoeller as a holding company with several global operating subsidiaries, including Schoeller Allibert.	
Schoeller Holdings Ltd. (Schoeller Holdings Ltd.)	Limassol/Cyprus	Founded in 1978 by Heinrich Felix Leopold Schoeller. This includes ship management such as Columbia Shipmanagement and the hotel group Columbia Hotels & Resorts.	125x125x

== Gallery ==
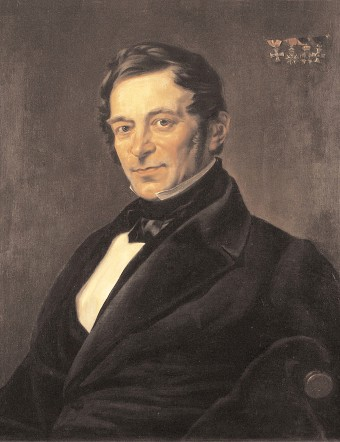
Portrait of Leopold Schoeller

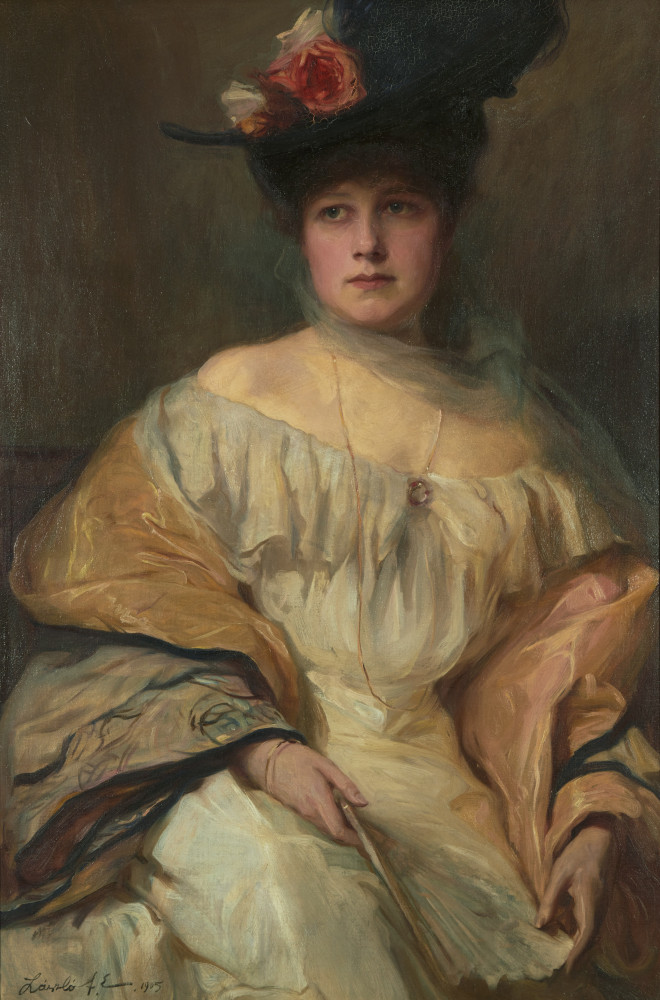
Portrait of Emmi Schoeller (née Siedenburg) by Philip de László, 1905

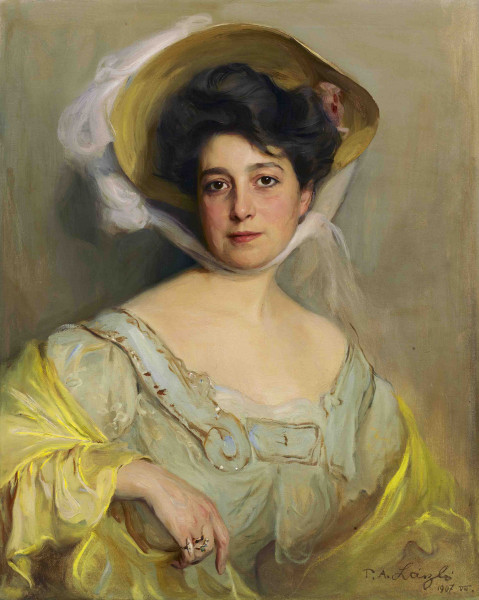
Portrait of Maria Schoeller (née Peill) by Philip de László, 1907

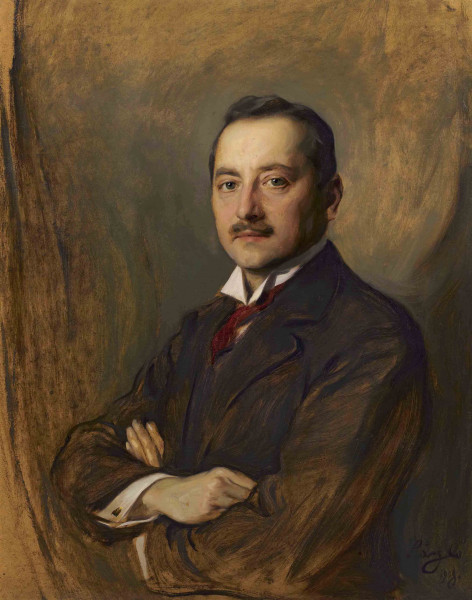
Portrait of Hugo Schoeller by Philip de László, 1908

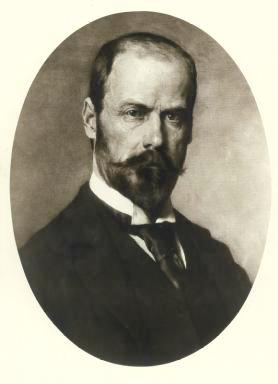
Portrait of Philipp Wilhelm von Schoeller
