= Freyung, Vienna =

Square in Vienna, Austria

Coordinates: 48°12′43″N 16°21′56″E

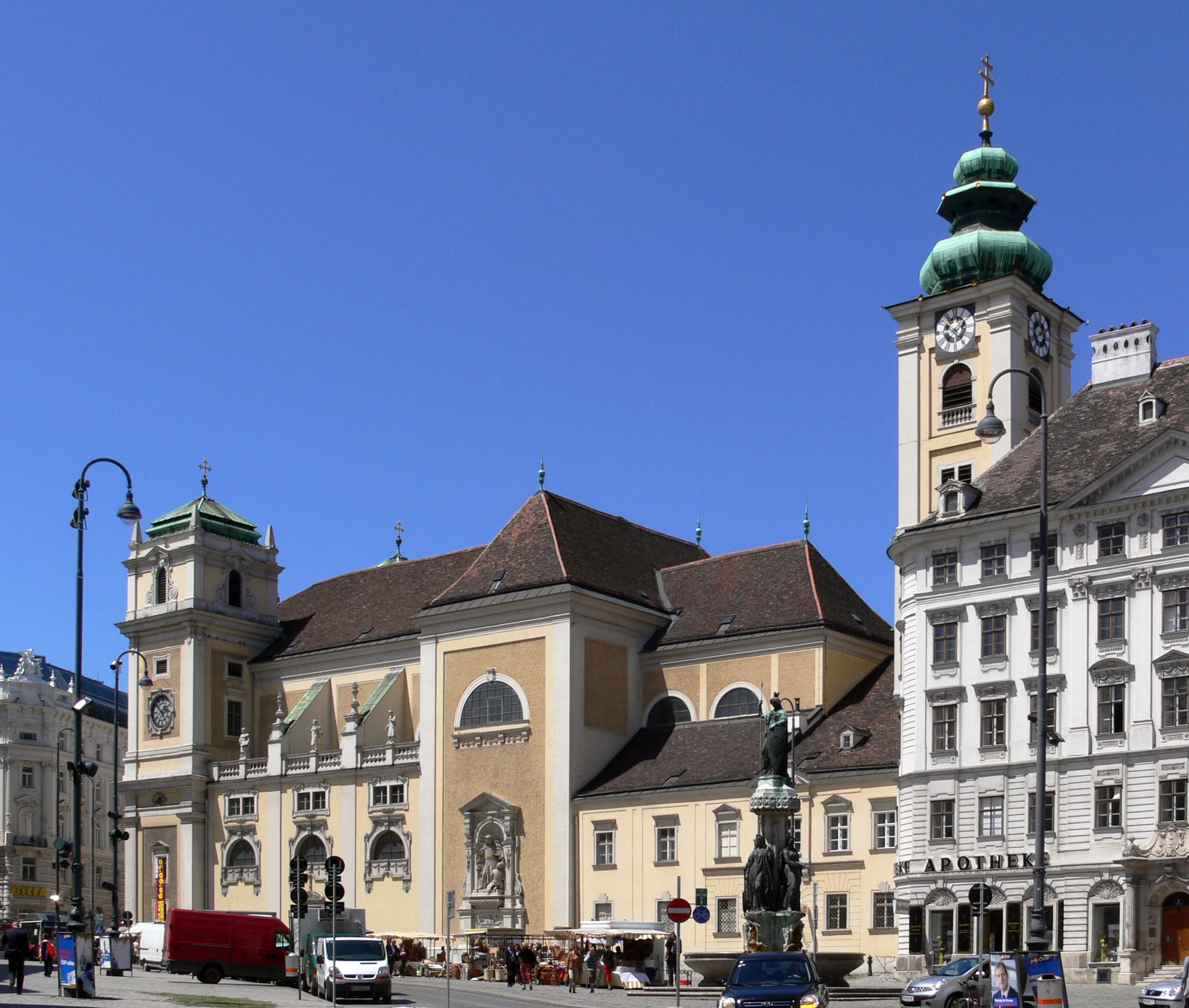
Schottenkirche on the Freyung, Vienna

The Freyung (German pronunciation: [ˈfʁaɪʊŋ]) is a triangular public square in Vienna, located in the Innere Stadt first district of the city.

== History ==
The square originally lay outside the Roman fortification walls of Vindabona. In the 12th century, Irish monks arrived by invitation of Duke Henry II of Austria to build a monastery. The monastery is called Schottenkloster, meaning Scottish Monastery, as Ireland at that time was known as New Scotland. The square around Schottenkloster was known as "bei den Schotten" ("at the Scots").

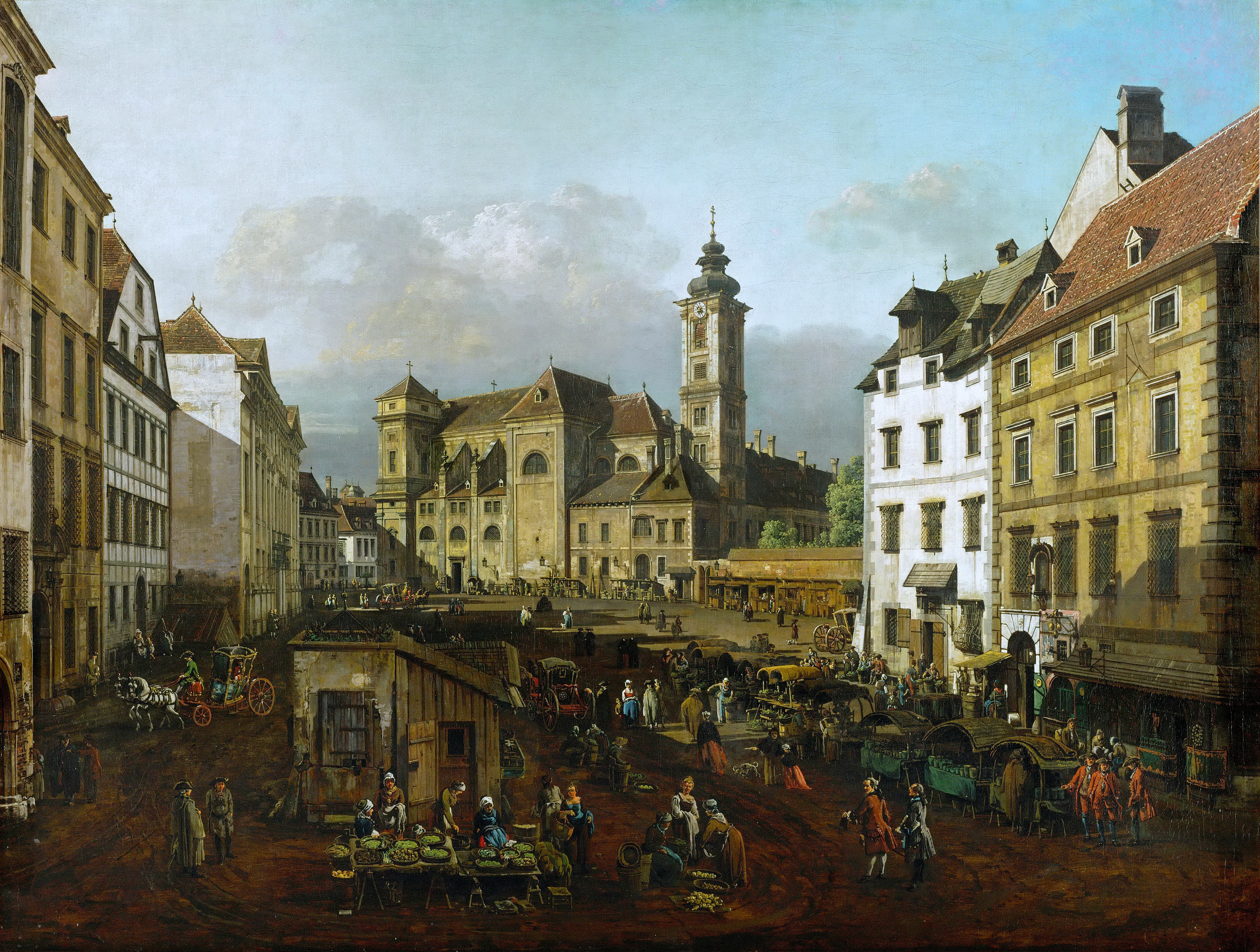
View of the Freyung, painted by Canaletto in 1758

The name Freyung has its origin from the old German word "frey", meaning "free". Since the monastery had the privilege of freedom from ducal authority, as well as the right to grant protection to fugitives, the square gained its name from its proximity to the Schottenkloster. The priory was added to the monastery in 1773 and became popularly known as Schubladkastenhaus (Chest of Drawers House) because of its shape.

The Freyung became an important market square, where various street artists and entertainers performed for their living. One of these performances was the Wiener Hanswurst (Viennese Fool) by Josef Stranitzky.

Since the Hofburg Imperial Palace was not far, in the 17th and 18th centuries many aristocrats established their city residences at the square, as well as the neighbouring Herrengasse.

In 1856, the houses between the Freyung and the adjacent square Am Hof were demolished to broaden the street between them. In the late 19th century banks and other financial houses also moved into the area and established headquarters.

Furthermore, the Austria-Brunnen fountain, erected in 1844-1846 by Ludwig Schwanthaler in honour of Emperor Ferdinand I of Austria, sits in the middle of the square.

== City palaces (known as Palais) ==
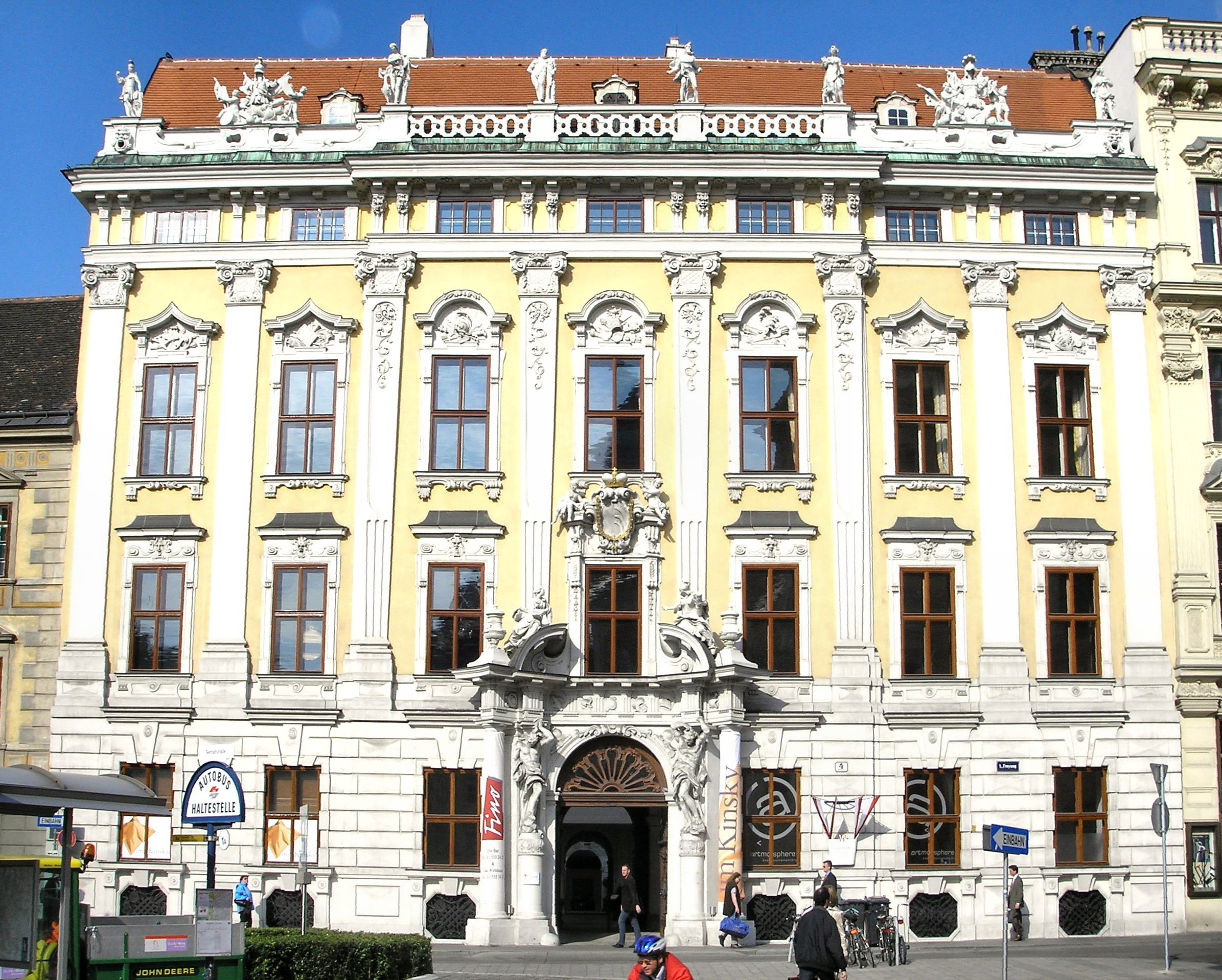
Palais Kinsky, Freyung 4

- Palais Hardegg (built in 1847, at Freyung 1)
- Palais Harrach (1690–1702, Freyung 3)
- Palais Kinsky (formerly Palais Daun, 1713–1716, Freyung 4)
- Palais Lamberg (replaced at the turn of the 19th century with a neo-baroque building, Freyung 5)
- Palais Ferstel (formerly Austro-Hungarian Bank, 1856–1860, at Freyung 2, with another entrance at Herrengasse 14. It was refurbished in the 1980s and now houses an exclusive shopping gallery and the famous Café Central.)
- Palais Schönborn-Batthyány (1692–1693, Renngasse 4)
- Palais Windisch-Graetz (1703, Renngasse 12)

== Close to ==
- Kunstforum (formerly an extension of the Creditanstalt head office, 1914, Freyung 8. It was refurbished in the 1980s and today houses the popular Kunstforum exhibition hall for modern and contemporary art shows, sponsored by Bank Austria.)
- Schoellerbank (a private bank, Renngasse 3)

== Trivia ==
- The Freyung has a Christmas market (Christkindlmarkt) every winter season, a tradition still kept since 1772.
- Parts of an old 13th century medieval pavement, uncovered during renovation works in front of the Palais Ferstel, were integrated into the modern pavement in the 1990s.

== Gallery ==
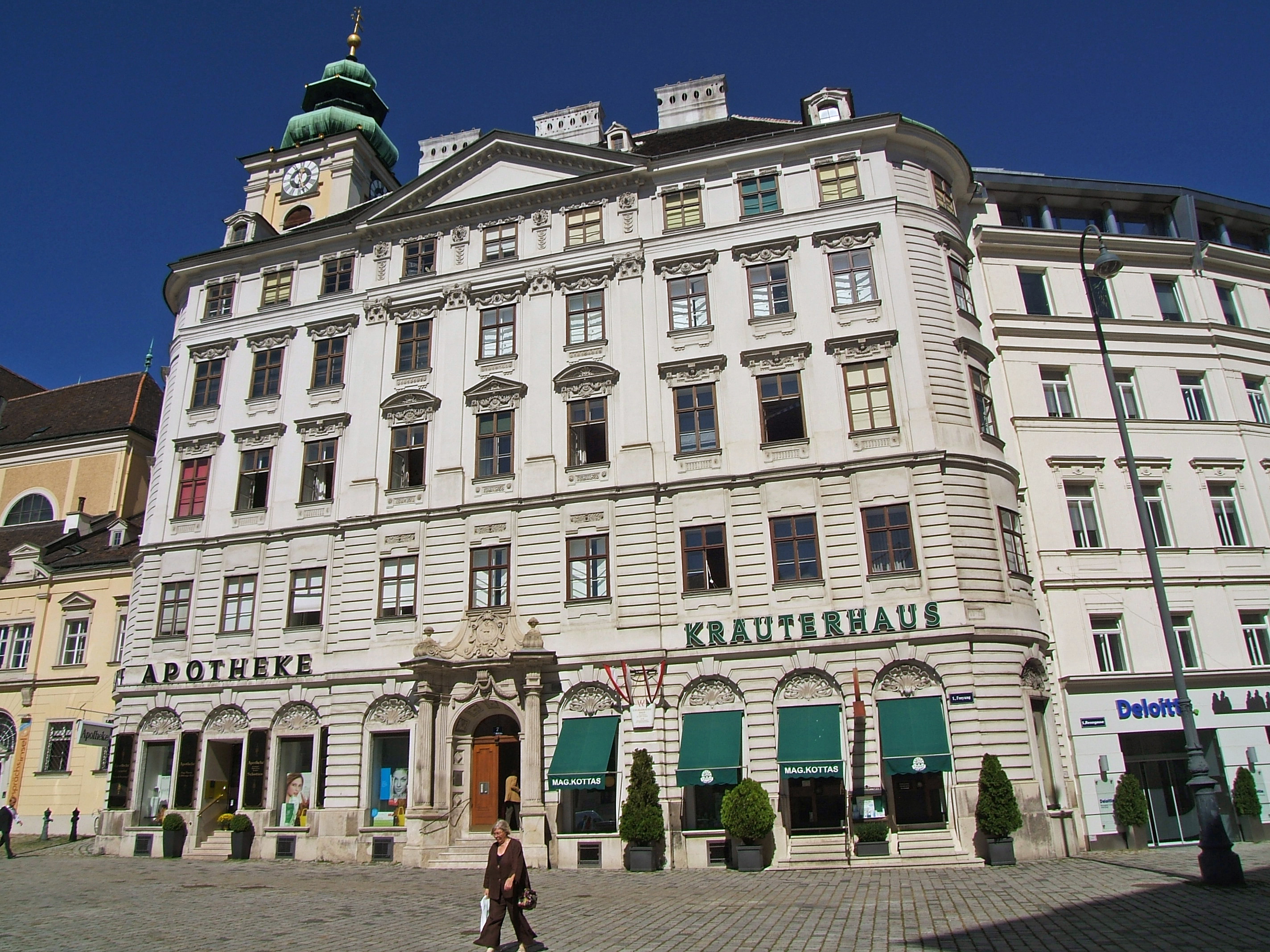
Apotheke and Krauterhaus

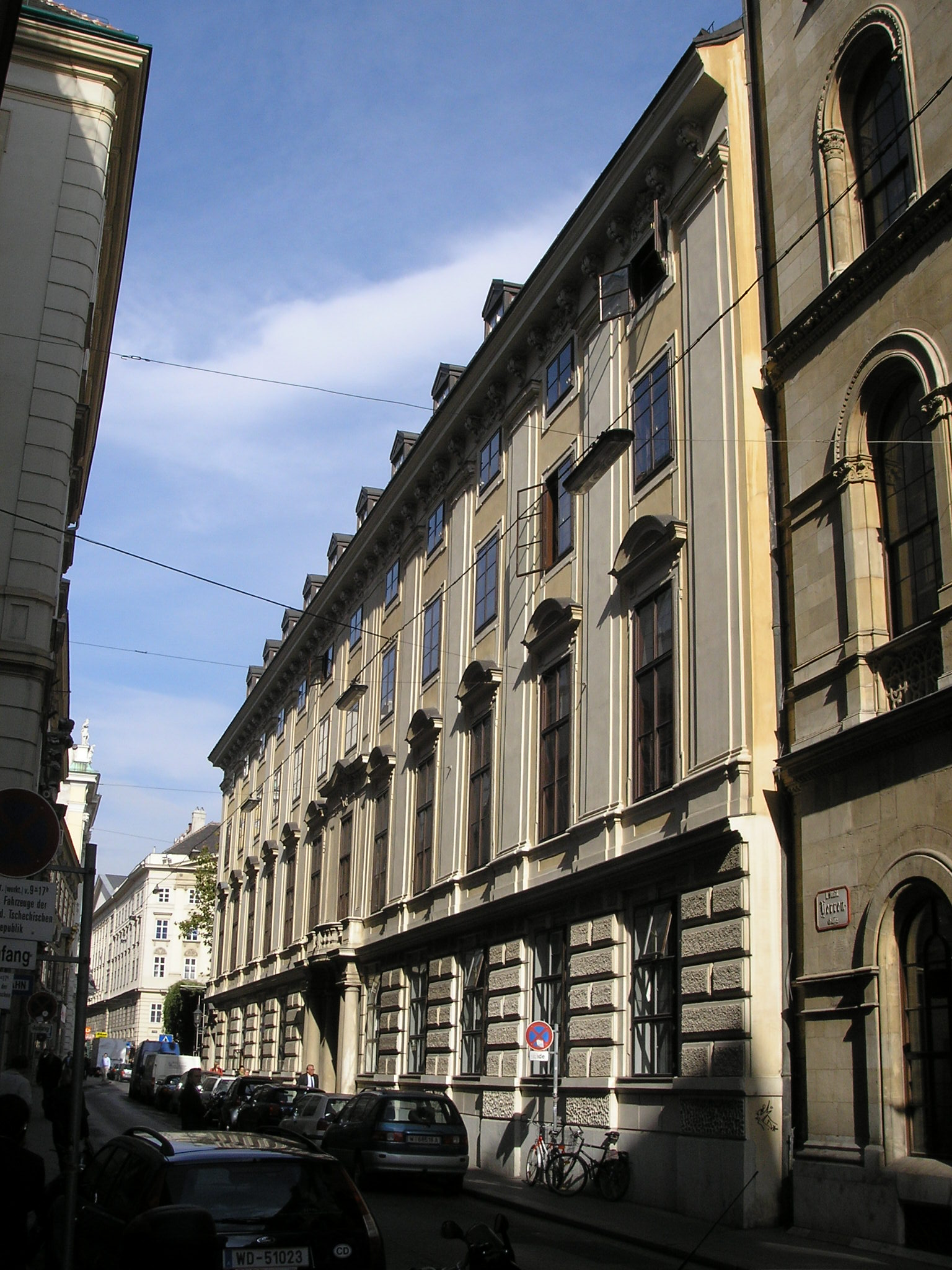
Palais Harrach

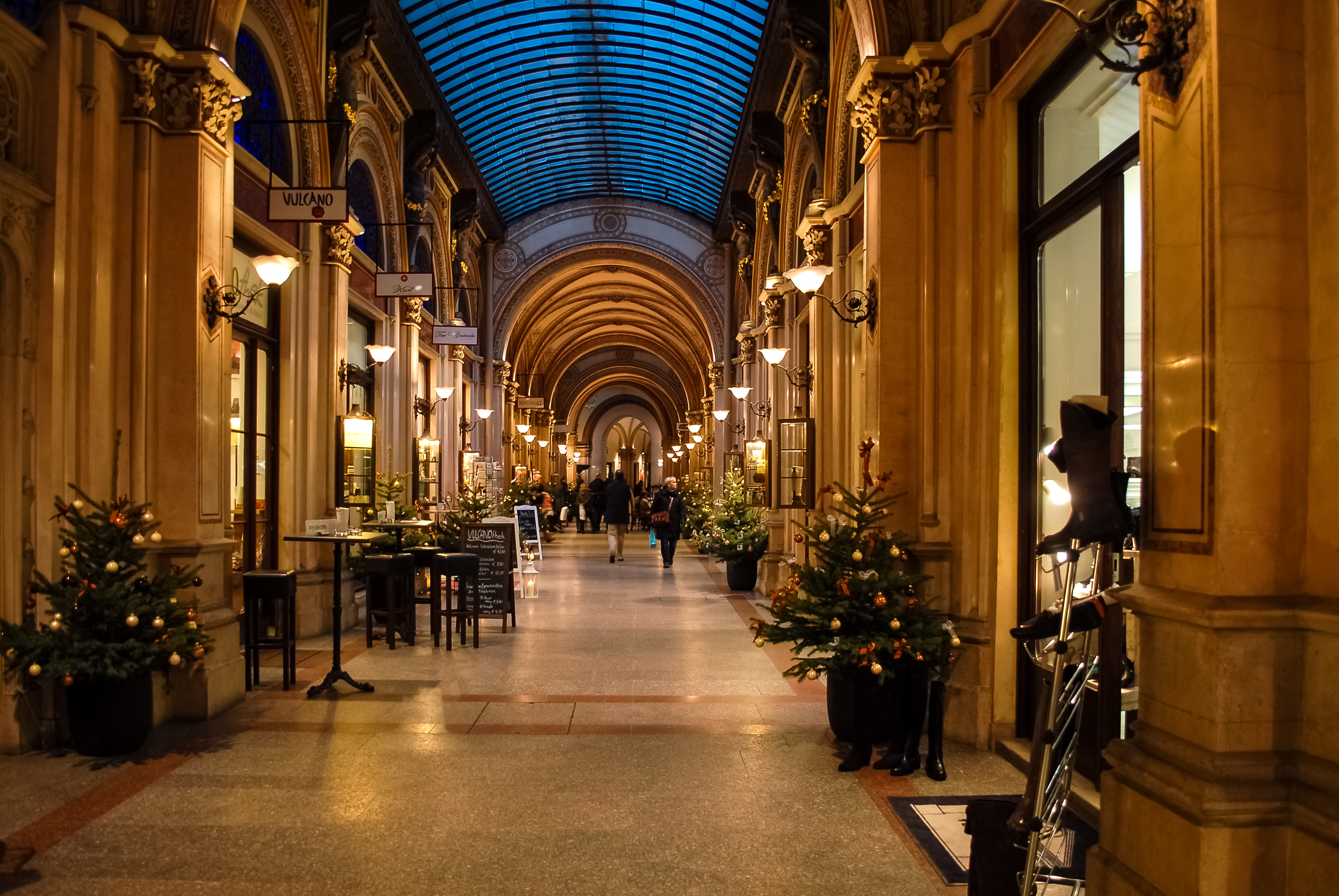
Freyung passage

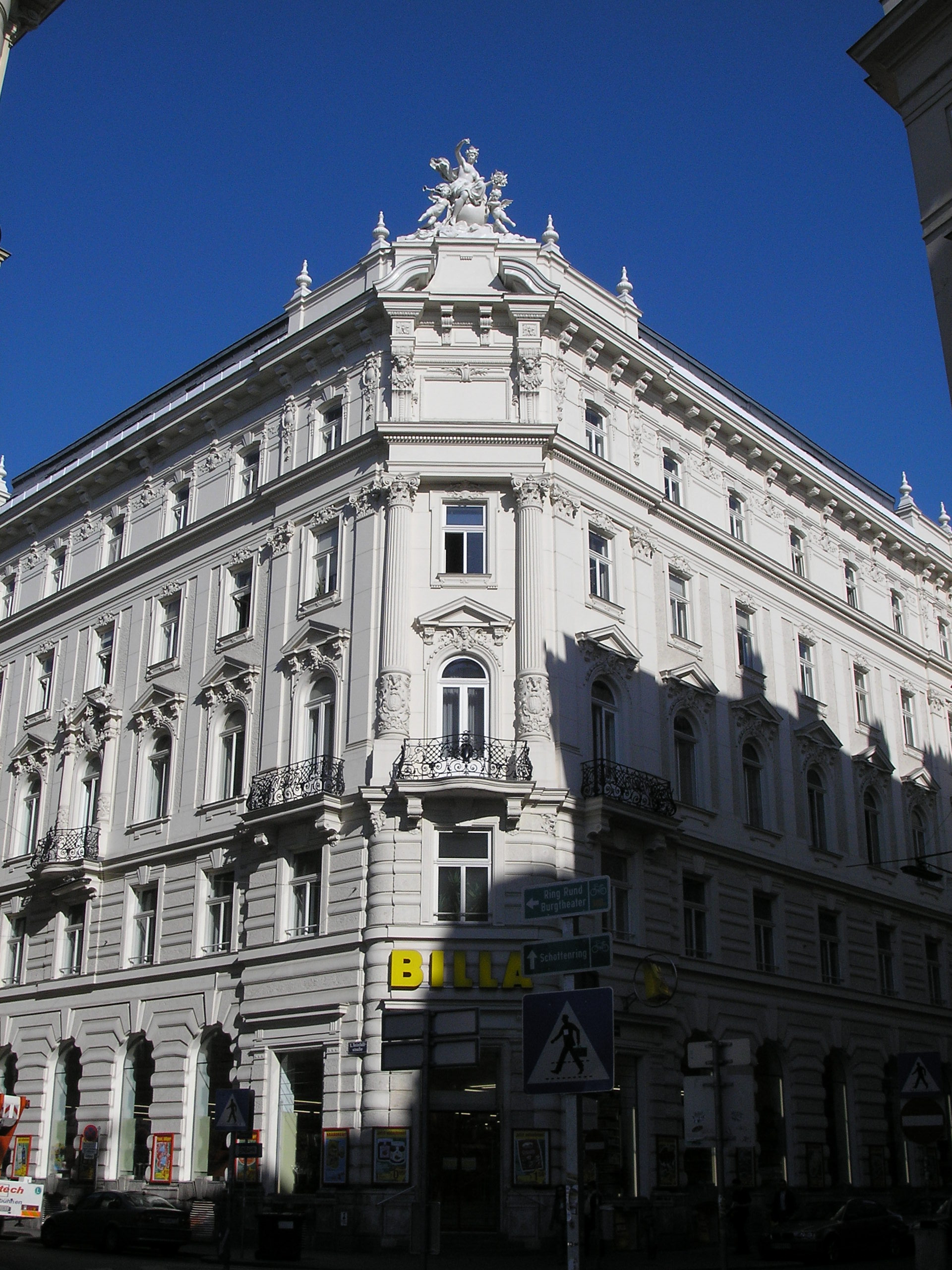
Freyung square

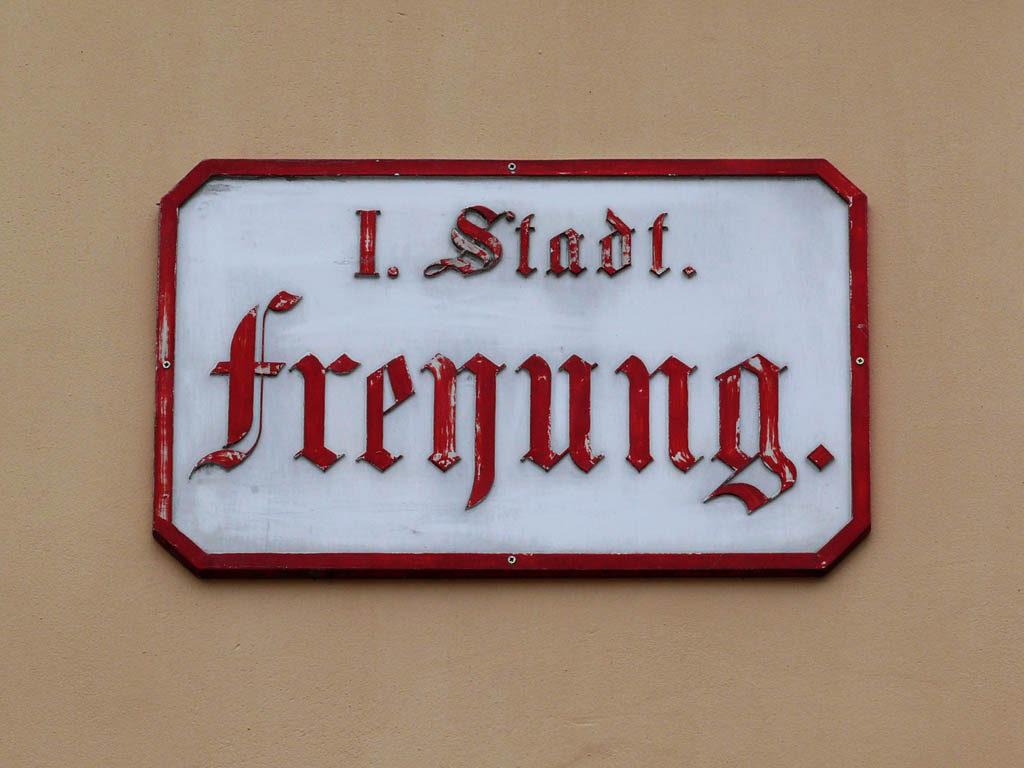
Street sign
