= Palais Rothschild (Renngasse) =

Palace in Vienna, Austria

Coordinates: 48°12′45″N 16°21′59″E

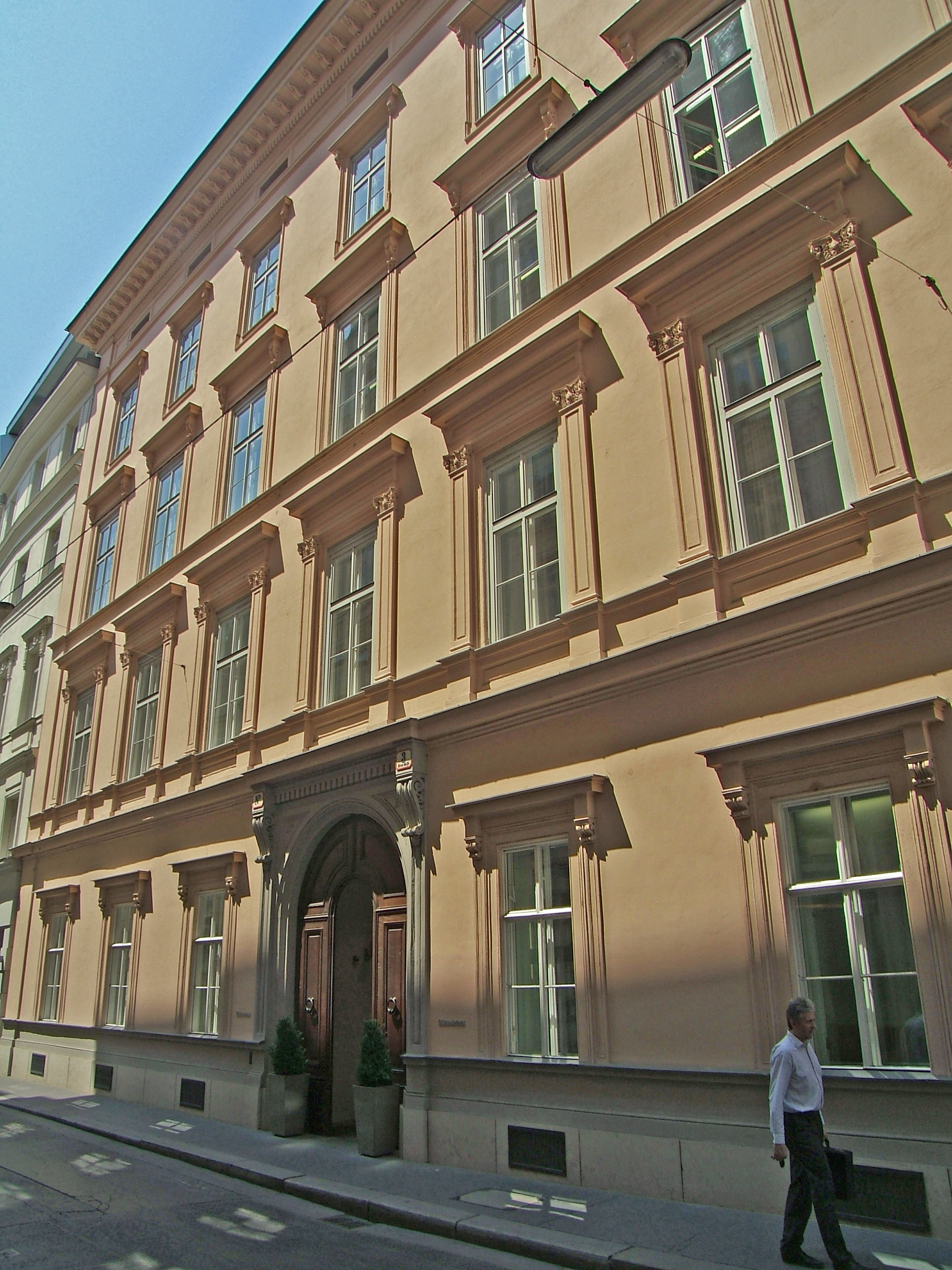
The Palais Rothschild on Renngasse

The Palais Rothschild is a former palatial residence in Vienna, Austria. It was one of five Palais Rothschild in the city that were owned by members of the Rothschild banking family of Austria, a branch of the international Rothschild family. It is located at Renngasse 3 in Vienna's 1st district, Innere Stadt.

== History ==
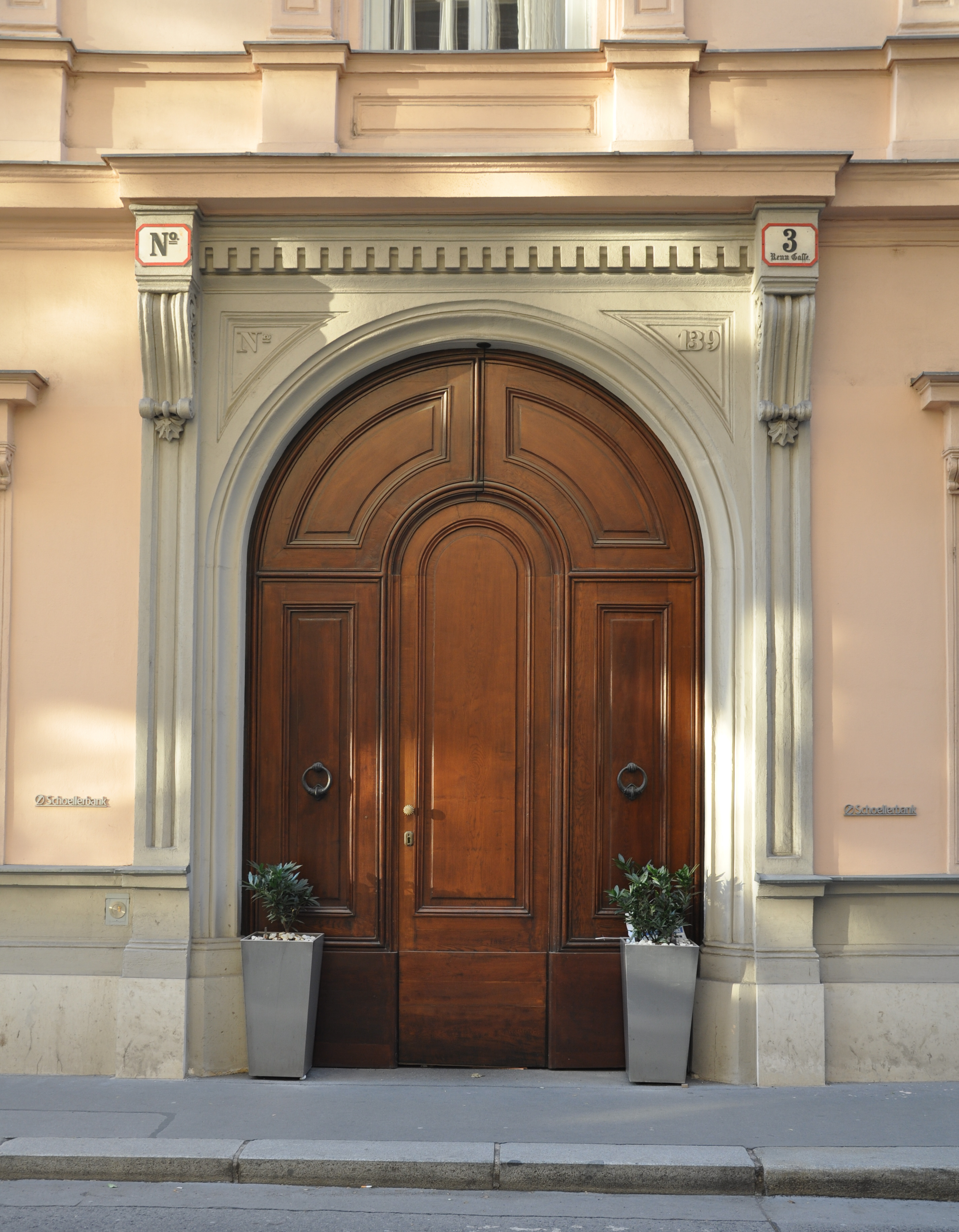
Entrance to the palace

The Palais Rothschild was built in 1847 by Ludwig Förster on behalf of Baron Salomon Mayer von Rothschild, the founder of the Austrian branch of the Rothschild family. The palace is located next to Palais Schönborn-Batthyány at Renngasse 4.

It was also the headquarters of the banking house S. M. von Rothschild, founded by Salomon, which was the largest and most important private bank in Austria until the "Anschluss" in 1938, and the subsequent "Aryanization". Today, this building houses the Schoellerbank, which acquired the palace from the Rothschild family in 1951.

=== Architectural details ===
The early historicist building protrudes from the Renngasse Street line on an axis. The remarkable façade has additional rows of straight-topped windows and a round-arch portal, and the main floor has Corinthian pilaster frames. The cornice projects far out.

The interior has been largely redesigned, incorporating older elements. A particularly striking feature is the glass staircase installed between 1999 and 2000.

== Gallery ==
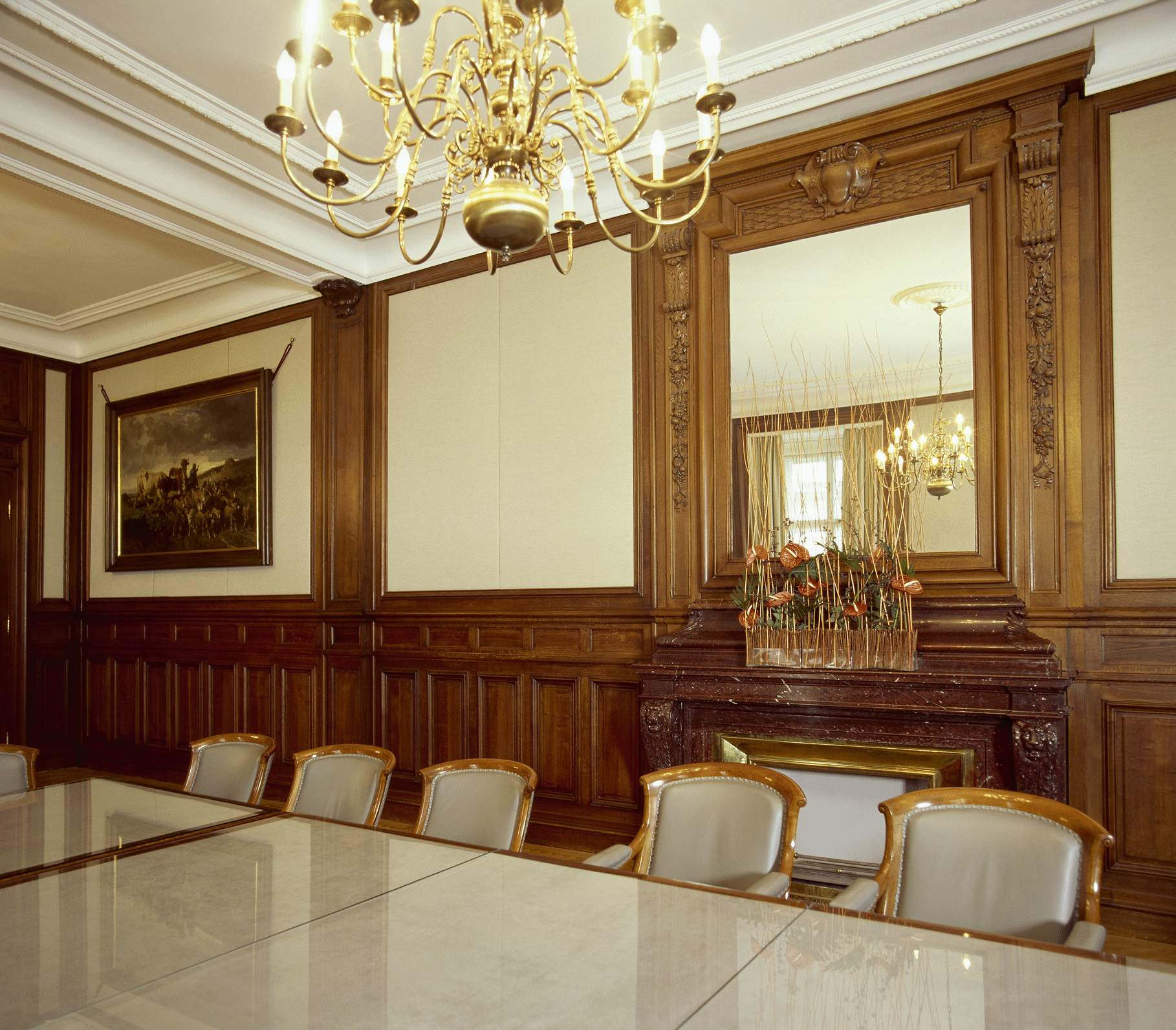
Interior

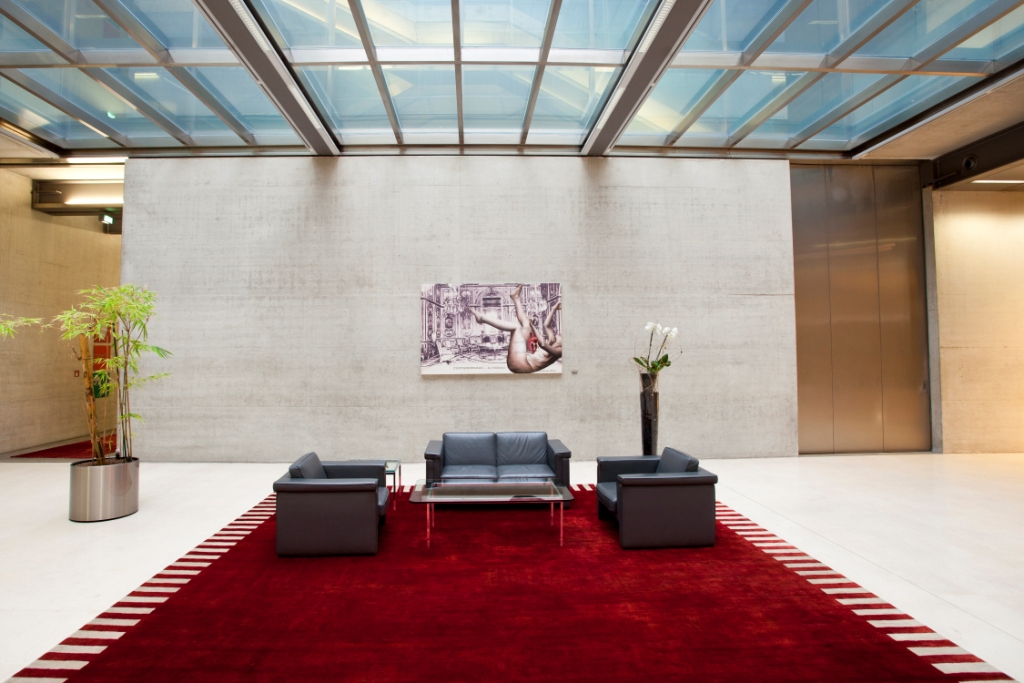
The foyer today

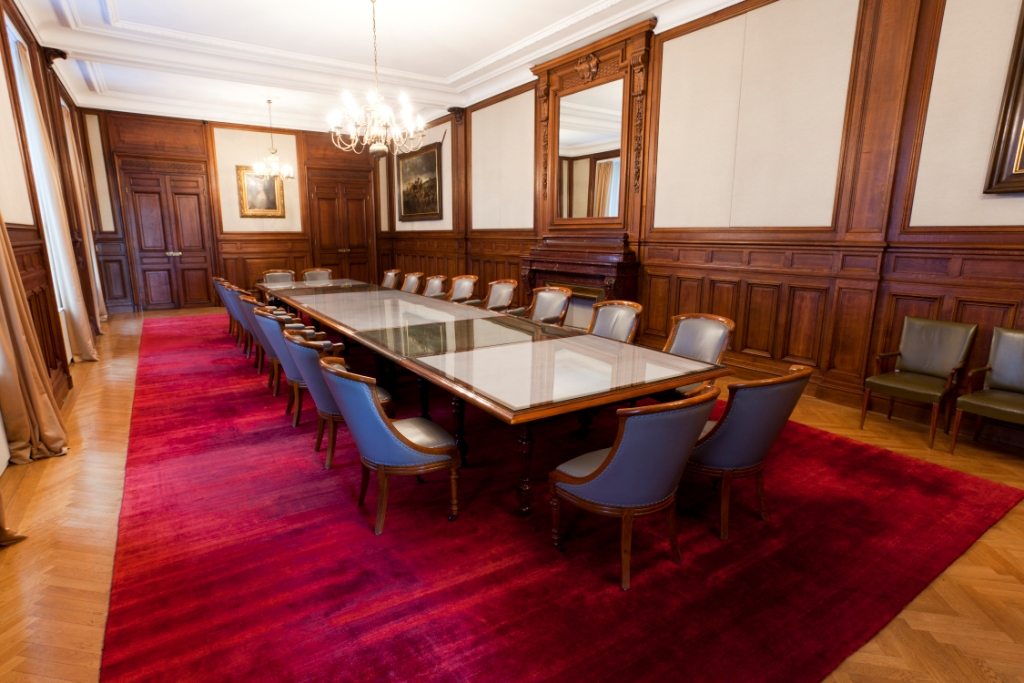
Interior

== See also ==
- Palais Rothschild
