= Rudolfine Steindling =

Austrian manager and political activist (1934–2012)

Rudolfine Steindling (Hebrew: רודולפין שטיינדלינג; September 10, 1934 – October 27, 2012 in Tel Aviv) was an Austrian manager and political activist with close ties to Communist organizations. She is alleged by German authorities to have stolen 130 million Euro (240 million incl. interest as of 2012) from East German accounts in the 1990s that belonged to the German state after the reunification.

== Early life ==
Rudolfine Steindling was married to Adolf Steindling, a Hungarian-Jewish resistance fighter and book author ("Vienna France Vienna. The Story of a Jewish Refugee and Resistant", "Hitting back : an Austrian Jew in the French résistance"). Starting in 1959, she was a member of the Communist Party of Austria; her membership officially lasted until 1969, only.

In 1973 she nevertheless became chief executive, and in 1978 trustee, of the controversial foreign trade company Novum GmbH, by German accounts an affiliate of East German Alexander Schalck-Golodkowski's Kommerzielle Koordinierung, while Austrian Communists maintained for the longest time it belongs to their local party. Steindling was also involved in the similar trading company "Transcarbon". Novum bought high tech equipment in the West that stood on the embargo lists and could not be exported to Eastern Block countries. A pseudo hard disk factory was built in Austria that consisted of nothing but empty halls. Novum bought modern hard disk equipment in the US and passed it on to East Germany, pretending to need it for their Austrian factory. A kickback of four per cent made Novum and Steindling rich.

She also had considerable income by representing Western companies like Bosch, Ciba-Geigy, Voestalpine and Steyr-Daimler-Puch in East Germany.

== Post-reunification activities ==
Following German reunification, there were €250 million in Novum accounts, about 100 million of which could be easily seized by German authorities in Switzerland.

In 1991 Steindling transferred the Austrian Novum balance from a branch of the Länderbank (from 1991 onwards called Bank Austria) account to one of the BFZ, a Swiss "Bank Austria" affiliate and then back to other Austrian accounts, according to Profil (see article below) likely abetted by CEOs René Alfons Haiden and his successor Gerhard Randa. She proceeded to go to the bank not fewer than 51 times and drew it all out the account in cash in suitcases in 1992.

In November 2004 the Federal Administrative Court in Leipzig ruled that the Novum assets, totaling €200 million, were the rightful property of the German government.

In 2010 a Swiss court ruled that the Bank Austria must pay 120 million Euro but a higher level of jurisdiction ruled there were procedural errors.

Since the 1990s, Steindling lived in Israel with her daughter Susanna as an influential socialite well-connected with the country's central fundraising organization Keren Hayesod where she was co-chairwoman, Yad Vashem, Tel Hashomer, and the Weizmann Institute of Science. Her daughter inherited several pieces of valuable real estate including a Döbling villa worth €15 million in 1994.
