= Schoellerbank =

Austrian private bank

Schoellerbank AG
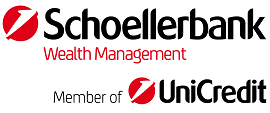
- Company type: Incorporated
- Industry: Financial services
- Founded: 1833; 193 years ago
- Headquarters: Freyung, Vienna, Austria
- Products: Wealth management, private banking
- Total assets: €3.09 billion (2023)
- Number of employees: 289
- Parent: Bank Austria UniCredit
- Website: www.schoellerbank.at

Schoellerbank is an Austrian private bank with headquarters in Vienna. It emerged from the wholesale and banking house Schoeller & Co. of the entrepreneurial Schoeller family.

== History ==
=== Founding period (1833–1896) ===
Schoeller & Co. was founded as a banking and wholesale house on July 20, 1833, by Alexander von Schoeller in Vienna. Because private banking was not yet developed at that time, wholesalers handled the financial transactions and the financing of exchange transactions. From the very beginning, the Schoeller wholesale business carried out banking transactions, initially for its own purposes and its own companies, but soon also for third parties. Soon after its formation, Schoeller involved his brother, Johann Paul von Schoeller, in the business.

Alexander von Schoeller used his banking profits to invest in industrial activities which quickly became extensive. Among other things, Schoeller was involved in various coal mines, sugar factories, the founding of the Berndorf Metal Goods Factory and the later Schoeller-Bleckmann Steelworks. The Schoeller companies in Austria-Hungary were centrally controlled by Schoeller & Co.

=== Fin de Siècle boom (1896–1914) ===
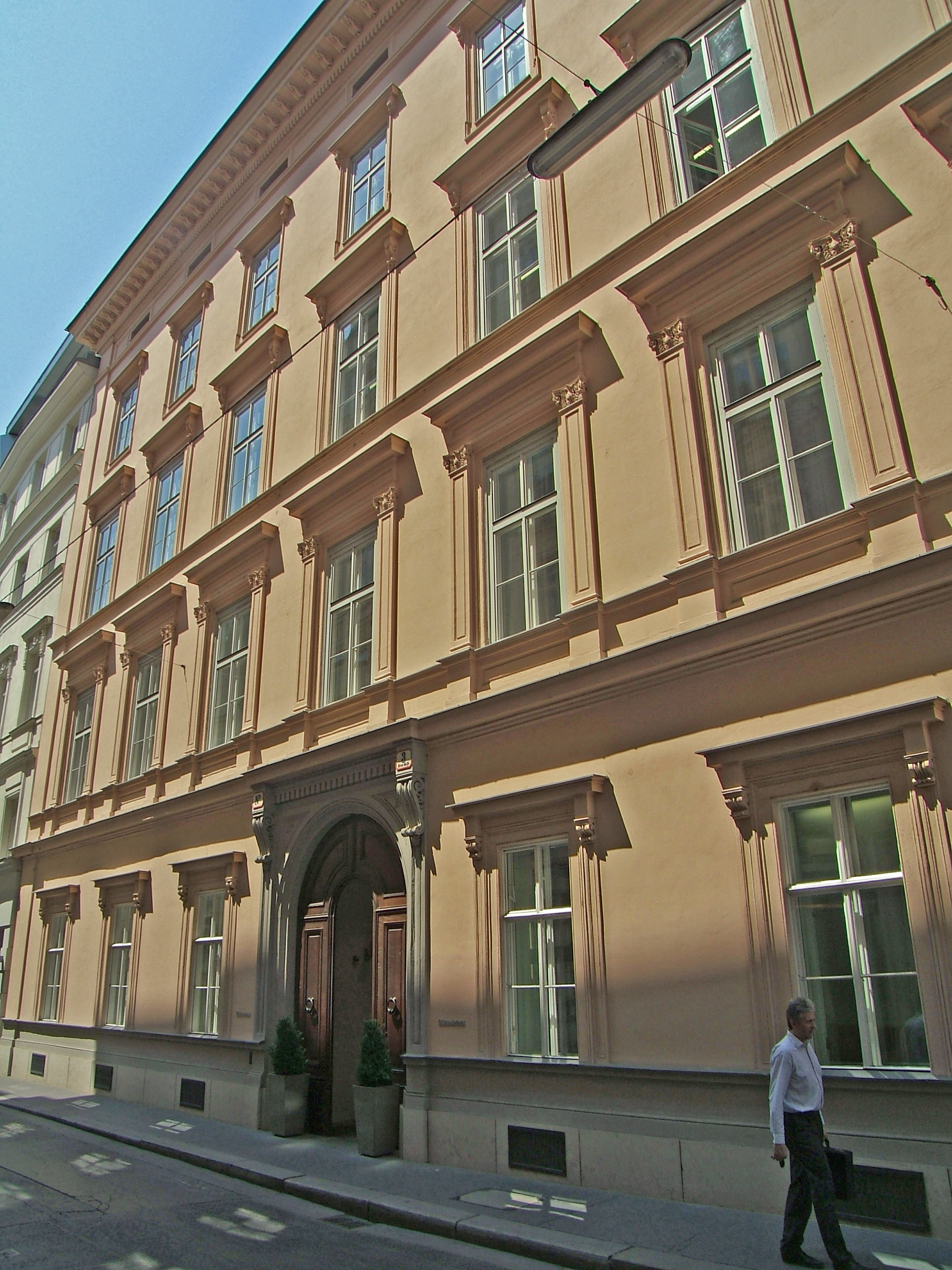
Schoellerbank's Vienna headquarters at the Palais Rothschild

In the period around 1900, known as the Fin de Siècle period, the company's banking division also prospered as part of the wholesale business. The main task of the banking department was to finance industrial operations, handle the group's commercial relations and payment transactions. A few years before World War I, in addition to trading, safekeeping and financing securities, the Schoellerbank was also very active in IPOs and capital increases of joint stock companies on the Vienna Stock Exchange.

=== World War I (1914–1918) ===
During World War I, the role of the bank varied. Since the bank was doing relatively well financially until 1917, a lot of money was spent on relief measures. By 1917, almost a million crowns had been donated to various causes. Money went to the Red Cross, to provide meals for workers in large companies, to the railway workers' sanatorium and to support interned Austrian prisoners of war.

=== First Republic (1918–1938) ===
The end of World War I and the collapse of the monarchy was a very difficult time for the company. The group and its industrial holdings were always geared towards the monarchy as a whole, and the domestic market was fragmented into a number of protectionist countries. The bank also had to contend with hyperinflation in the early 1920s. However, the balance sheet was closed after the introduction of the Schilling on January 1, 1925, through the Gold Opening Balance Sheet Act. During the banking crisis of the early 1930s, the bank was able to meet all of its obligations to other institutions and survived unscathed.

=== Third Reich (1938–1945) ===
The wholesale business, which had been very important until the end of the Danube Monarchy, could not continue to operate after 1938 due to the National Socialist Banking Act. Therefore, Schoeller & Co. began to consolidate and, later, expand its industrial position in the so-called Ostmark in order to secure the existence of Austrian industry. When the Battle of Vienna was won in mid-April 1945, the Red Army occupied the city and the bank was placed under public administration, which was lifted on April 1, 1948.

=== Second Republic (since 1945) ===
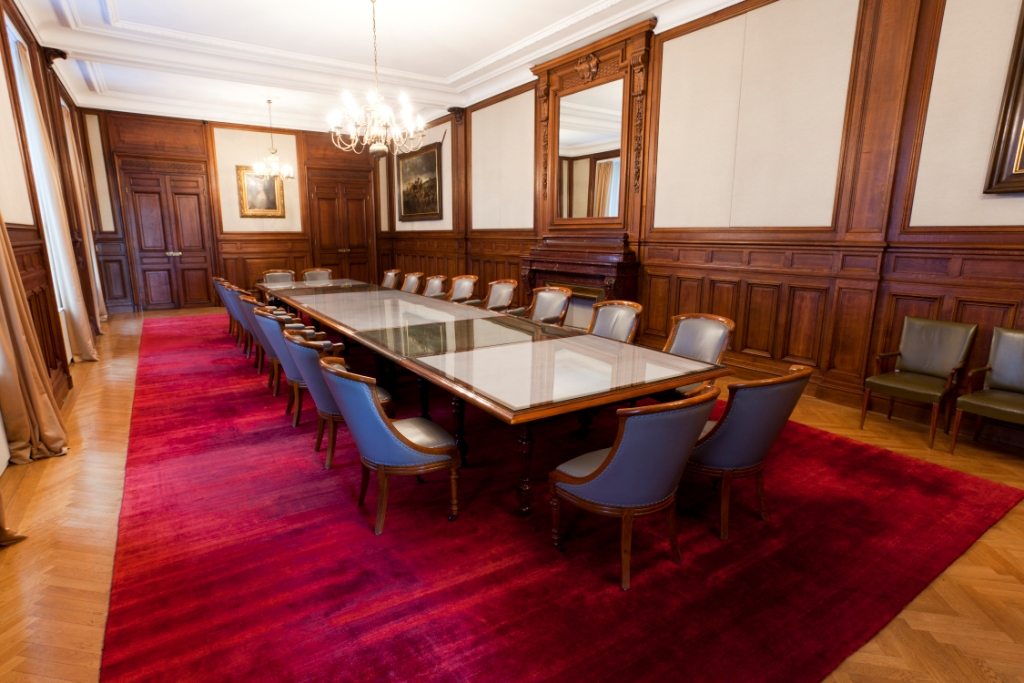
Rothschilds Hall

After the end of World War II, the bank had to change its business policies because its partners in Germany were temporarily unable to act due to strict foreign exchange control and interruptions in business relations with the countries behind the Iron Curtain. In 1951, the bank purchased the Palais Rothschild from the Rothschild family (it had been confiscated in 1938 but was returned to its owners after the war).

In the 1960s, the bank gradually developed into a universal bank. Due to a change in the Austrian Banking Act at the end of the 1970s, the bank's legal form was changed to a stock corporation, whereupon the Schoeller family sold the majority share in the bank. These were sold to Raiffeisen Zentralbank. In 1989, the numismatics division was spun off to form Schoeller Münzhandel, a trading company for classic and modern numismatics as well as precious metal investment products based in Vienna. Schoellerbank itself was sold to Bayerische Vereinsbank in 1992, and merged with Salzburger Kredit and Wechsel Bank (SKWB for short) in 1998 to form SKWB Schoellerbank. The background to this was the merger of the two parent institutions to form HypoVereinsbank. In 2000, Bank Austria Creditanstalt (BA-CA for short) was taken over by HypoVereinsbank. In 2001, the corporate and real estate customer business was transferred to the then parent company BA-CA .

Since then, Schoellerbank has concentrated on wealth management and private banking, the bank's traditional core business. In 2003, the company name was changed from SKWB Schoellerbank to Schoellerbank AG, with its headquarters at the Palais Rothschild, at Renngasse 3, in Freyung, Vienna. In 2005, HypoVereinsbank was taken over by UniCredit.
