= Austria Metall =

Austrian aluminum company

AMAG Austria Metall AG
- Company type: Public
- Traded as: WBAG: AMAG
- ISIN: AT00000AMAG3
- Industry: metal manufacturer
- Predecessor: Berndorfer Metallwarenfabrik
- Founded: 1938
- Headquarters: Lamprechtshausener Straße 61, 5282 Braunau-Ranshofen, Austria
- Products: metal, aluminum
- Number of employees: 1,991 (2020)
- Website: www.amag.at

AMAG (Austria Metall AG) is the biggest company in the Austrian aluminium industry sector. It is situated in the village of Ranshofen, which is in Braunau am Inn (Upper Austria).

== Company history ==
=== Foundation and nationalization ===
After the annexation, an aluminum smelter known as Mattigwerk (named after the river Mattig) was built in 1939 by Vereinigte Aluminiumwerke AG, Berlin in Ranshofen near Braunau am Inn. After the Second World War, US troops occupied the plant and handed it over to the re-established Republic of Austria in 1946.

Aluminiumwerke Ranshofen GmbH, which was founded by the Republic of Austria in 1946, had effectively taken over the assets of Vereinigte Aluminiumwerke AG, Berlin, which had until then been publicly administered and located in Austria, as an Auffanggesellschaft in 1957. These operations, the aluminum smelter in Ranshofen and the bauxite mine in Unterlaussa, were nationalized in 1946.

Österreichische Metallwerke Aktiengesellschaft was founded by the Republic of Austria in 1948 and set up pressing and rolling mill facilities in Ranshofen for the production of semi-finished aluminum products.

=== United Metalworks Ranshofen-Berndorf (VMW) ===
1957 saw the merger of Aluminiumwerke Ranshofen GesmbH and Österreichische Metallwerke AG with Berndorfer Metallwarenfabrik Arthur Krupp AG, Berndorf, also nationalized in 1946, as the absorbing company, whose name was changed to Vereinigte Metallwerke Ranshofen-Berndorf AG in connection with this merger. In 1958 the registered office was transferred from Berndorf to Braunau. As a result of a further merger, Leichtmetall-GesmbH, Vienna-Berndorf, was incorporated into Vereinigte Metallwerke Ranshofen-Berndorf AG in 1958.

The company had plants in Ranshofen, Berndorf, Amstetten, Unterlaussa and Esslingen am Neckar as well as a forestry estate in Halltal near Mariazell. It produced primary aluminum and aluminum alloys in ingots, semi-finished products made of aluminum and aluminum alloys, semi-finished products made of non-ferrous metals, metal goods, apparatus and containers, window frames and the like, cutlery, tableware and gift articles, film casting strips and bauxite. The company employed around 4,400 workers and salaried employees. The company owned all the ordinary shares in Gemeinnützige Wohnungsgesellschaft "Arthur Krupp" GesmbH, Berndorf, and all the shares in J. C. Klinkosch AG, Vienna, with which there was a consolidated relationship. In the fall of 1960 all shares in the former foreign subsidiaries Societa per Azioni Italiana Metalli ed Argenteria Arthur Krupp, Milan and Berndorfer Metall-Werk AG, Lucerne were acquired.[3] The company was further consolidated in the form of a sectoral grouping.

In order to further combine nationalized industrial companies sector by sector, Vereinigte Wiener Metallwerke AG, Montanwerke Brixlegg GesmbH in return for shares in Österreichische Industrieverwaltungs-AG, and Metallwerk Möllersdorf AG in return for shares in the transferring company were merged with Vereinigte Metallwerke Ranshofen-Berndorf AG by absorption in 1974. In 1978, Berndorfer Aluminium-Verarbeitungs GesmbH, Berndorf, was merged by absorption. At about the same time, with the dispute over a commissioning of the Zwentendorf nuclear power plant, it became known that VMW Ranshofen, a major consumer of electrical energy, was receiving a blatantly favorable electricity price, which could be seen as a covert promotion of aluminum production.

In 1981, it was decided to build a can plant in Enzesfeld, Lower Austria, which went into operation in 1983.[4] This can plant was operated by Rexam from 1983 to 2016.

=== Restructuring to form Austria Metall AG under the umbrella of ÖIAG ===
In 1984, the final operations in Berndorf and Vienna became independent and were transformed into autonomous GesmbH's (Berndorf Metallwaren GesmbH was privatized 100% in 1988 in the form of a management buy-out). At the beginning of 1985, the company was renamed Austria Metall Aktiengesellschaft (AMAG).[5]

In the course of a structural concept for the operations of the ÖIAG Group adopted by Österreichische Industrieholding AG (ÖIAG), which, in accordance with the principle of coordinated decentralization, divided the old subgroups into smaller companies and reorganized them into industry groups according to the sectors to which they belonged, a far-reaching restructuring occurred at Austria Metall AG: With retroactive effect from January 1, 1987, Austria Metall AG hived off its operating functions into independent companies and concentrated exclusively on the functions of a holding company for the nonferrous metals sector.

The primary aluminum production and processing activities were transferred to AMAG Metall GesmbH, Ranshofen, the secondary aluminum business to Austria Sekundär-Aluminium GesmbH, Ranshofen, the copper smelter to Montanwerke Brixlegg GesmbH, Brixlegg (51% of this company was sold to Metallgesellschaft Austria AG, Vienna, in 1989), and the semi-finished copper product sector was spun off to Buntmetall Amstetten GesmbH, Amstetten (100% of this company was privatized in 1989 in the form of a management buyout).

At the beginning of 1990, the Group was again restructured and henceforth divided into six divisions:

AMAG Metal (tankhouses in Australia and Canada, remelting plants in Ranshofen, Wuppertal and Furth). AMAG Rolled Products (rolling mills in Ranshofen and Unna) AMAG Extrusion (BOAL Group, Aluminium Ranshofen Preßwerk GesmbH, AMAG AluTeam Extrusion AG, Aluminiumwerk Unna AG, AluTeam Metal Forming GmbH, Unna, AluTeam Wexal, Ireland) AMAG Formprodukte (foundry and forging companies in Austria, Germany, Hungary and France) AMAG Packaging (European Packaging Holding) AMAG Systems (processing of semi-finished rolled products, extrusion and cast products) From the Moulded Products Division, Aluminiumgießerei Villingen GmbH, Villingen-Schwenningen, Germany, was sold to Hans Joachim Schönberg in the fall of 1991.[6]

=== Privatization ===
AMAG Ranshofen with new hot and cold rolling mill AMAG Ranshofen with new hot and cold rolling mill (2018) AMAG was privatized in 1996. Through the management buy-out of Klaus Hammerer (40%) with participation of Constantia (40%) and Arbeitnehmer Privatstiftung (20%). In 2007, Hammerer's shares were sold to Constantia Packaging AG, with the exception of the former AMAG extrusion GmbH (press shop), which remains in Hammerer's ownership (now HAI Hammerer Aluminium Industries GmbH). In addition, the purchase of 10% of the employee foundation by Constantia was finally completed in November 2007.

In 2000, the can plant in Enzesfeld was sold to Rexam and has been part of the Ardagh Group since 2017.

Since April 8, 2011, the shares of AMAG Austria Metall AG have been traded on the official market (Prime Market) of the Vienna Stock Exchange under the ticker symbol "AMAG". From September 24, 2012, to September 23, 2013, the company was represented in the ATX. According to the company, it has been producing at 100 percent capacity utilization at the Ranshofen plant since 2010.

Since October 2014, B&C Industrieholding GmbH has held a voting majority of 52.7% in AMAG Austria Metall AG.[7]

In November 2014, AMAG opened the new hot rolling mill as well as the plate production and the expanded foundry at the Ranshofen site.[8] In June 2017, the new cold rolling mill and the associated finishing facilities were opened. In parallel, the foundry and recycling capacities were also expanded again. The EUR 535 million plant expansion was thus successfully completed. The Ranshofen site is thus home to the most modern aluminum rolling mill in Europe.[9]

In the 2017 financial year, AMAG's sales exceeded EUR 1 billion for the first time, sales volumes reached a new record of 421,700 tons, and recycling reached a new record of 348,000 tons of aluminum scrap used. AMAG is thus on a sustainable growth path with a target capacity of more than 300,000 tons in the rolled products sector.[10]

In September 2018, AMAG became the world's first integrated company with rolling mill, foundry and recycling to be certified according to the ASI Performance Standard.[11][12]

== Corporate data ==
2020:

Sales (million €): 904.2

Employees: 1991

2018:[13]

Sales (€ million): 1,101.6

Employees: 1959

2017:[10]

Sales (€ million): 1,036.2

Employees: 1881

2016:[14]

Sales (€ million): 906.2

Employees: 1762

2015:[15]

Sales (€ million): 913.3

Employees: 1704

2014:[16]

Sales (€ million): 823.0

Employees: 1638

2013:

Sales (€ million): 786.4

Employees: 1564

2012:

Sales (€ million): 819.8

Employees: 1490

2011:

Sales (€ million): 813.1

Employees: 1,422

2010:

Sales (€ million): 728.0

Employees: 1,175

== Operating companies and businesses ==
Key figures 2018[13]

AMAG rolling GmbH

- Sales volume: 222,900 tons
- Sales (€ million): 892.4
- Employees: 1,500
- Main markets: Western Europe, North America, Asia
- Main customers: packaging industry, mechanical engineering, automotive and aerospace industries, transportation, electrical and construction industries, ski and sporting goods manufacturers
- Main products: Bright grades, tread plates, shates, sheets and strips, cathode sheets, braze clad materials, high-strength materials (e.g. titanal) for sports and industry, but also a wide variety of alloys for automotive and aerospace industries

AMAG casting GmbH

- Sales volume: 86,900 tons
- Sales (million €): 114.2
- Employees: 124
- Main markets: Germany, Austria, Italy, Benelux countries
- Main products: HSG ingots, 2-part ingots, sows and liquid aluminum
- Main customers: Automotive and supplier industry, mechanical engineering

AMAG metal GmbH (metal trading company), handles the metal flow of the AMAG Group as a metal trading company and thus represents the Group's interface to the raw materials market.

Aluminerie Alouette

- Total production (t/year): 600,000
- 20% AMAG share
- Partners: Alcan (40%), Hydro (20%), SGF/Marubeni (20%)
- Products: Electrolysis: Primary aluminum & Foundry: Sows, ingots

Employees AMAG metal GmbH (incl. 20% personnel share in Aluminerie Alouette): 188

Sales volume AMAG metal GmbH: 114,900 tons

Sales AMAG metal GmbH (million €): 785.6

AMAG service GmbH (site services)

== Manufactured products ==
Austria Metall AG is a leading supplier of:

- Rolled products
- Cast alloys in the form of ingots and liquid metal
- Primary aluminum

== Individual references ==
1. 1 HISTORY (Memento of February 21, 2018 in the Internet Archive), amag.at.
2. 2 Annual report 2018. in: amag-al4u.com. Retrieved May 13, 2019.
3. 3 Finanz Compass Österreich 1961, page 643 (direct link via ZEDHIA to p. 643).
4. 4 Now fixed: can plant in Enzesfeld. In: Arbeiter-Zeitung. Vienna October 15, 1981, p. 10 (The website of the Arbeiter-Zeitung is currently being redesigned. The linked pages are therefore not accessible. – Digital copy).
5. 5 Finanz Compass Österreich 1987/88, p. 1319 (direct link via ZEDHIA to p. 1319)
6. 6 Finanz Compass Österreich 1992/93, page 69 (direct link via ZEDHIA to p. 69)
7. 7 Wirtschaftsblatt.at: Oberbank largely withdraws from Amag. October 16, 2014, archived from the original on October 18, 2014; retrieved August 28, 2015.
8. 8 AMAG: New hot rolling mill in Ranshofen puts AMAG in the top league. (No longer available online.) In: www.AMAG.at. AMAG, November 25, 2014, archived from the original on April 9, 2018; retrieved April 9, 2018.
9. 9 AMAG: AMAG opens Europe's most modern aluminum cold rolling mill. In: www.AMAG.at. AMAG, June 23, 2017; retrieved April 9, 2018.
10. 10 AMAG: AMAG Annual Report 2017. (No longer available online.) AMAG, February 27, 2018, archived from the original on February 27, 2018; retrieved February 27, 2018 (German).
11. 11 AMAG Austria Metall AG: AMAG certifies itself for the ASI Performance Standard. Retrieved December 17, 2018.
12. 12 AMAG Austria Metall AG. In: Aluminium Stewardship Initiative. Retrieved December 17, 2018 (English).
13. 13 AMAG Austria Metall AG: Annual Report 2018. In: www.amag-al4u.com. AMAG Austria Metall AG, February 28, 2019, accessed February 28, 2019.
14. 14 Archived copy (Memento of February 27, 2018 at the Internet Archive).
15. 15 AMAG: AMAG annual report 2015. in: AMAG. AMAG, retrieved February 21, 2018 (German).
16. 16 Annual Report 2014 (PDF)
