= Miškovice =

- Cadastral area of Prague
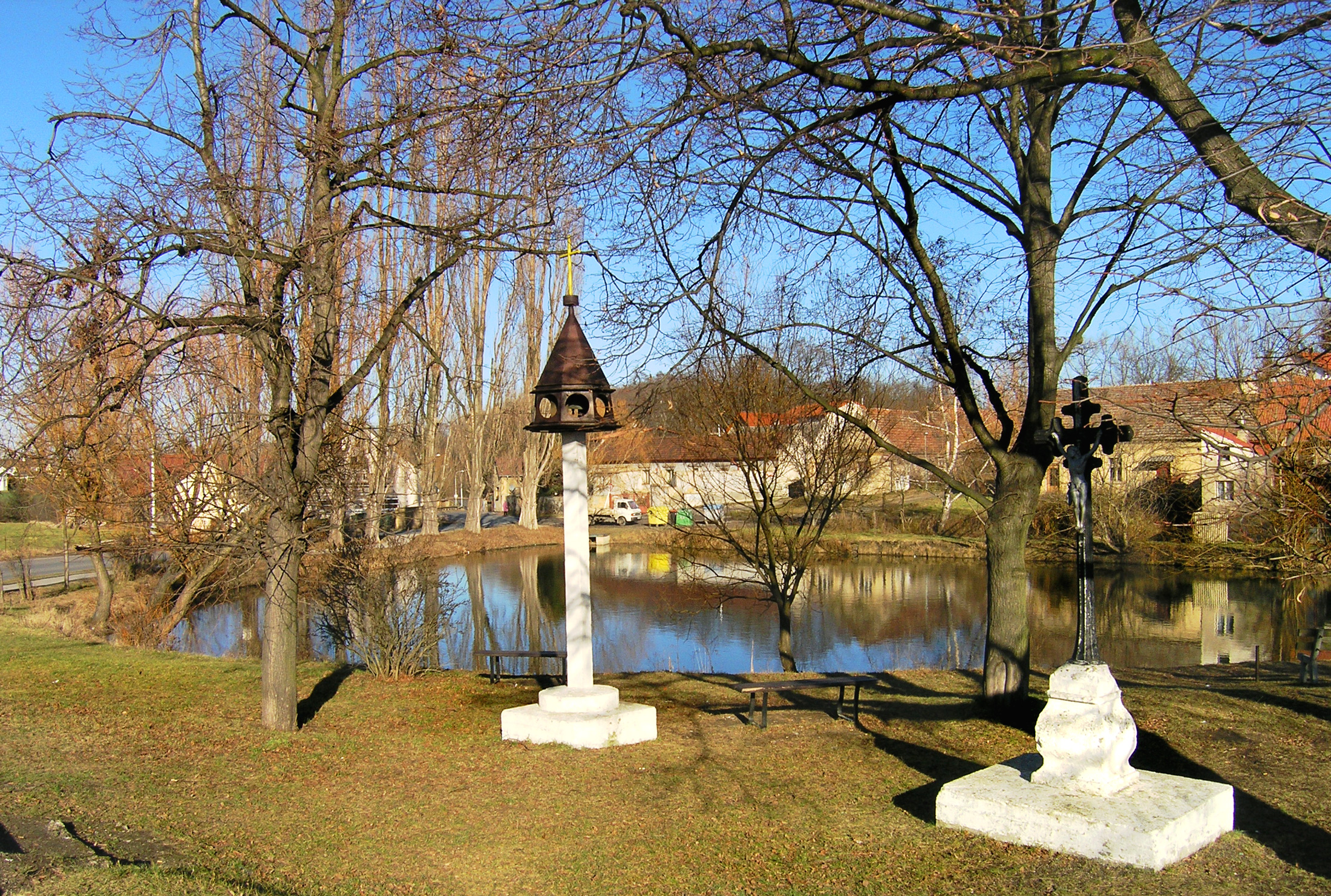
- Interactive map of Miškovice
- Coordinates: 50°9′26″N 14°32′30″E
- Country: Czech Republic
- Region: Prague
- District: Prague 18
- Municipal part: Čakovice
- Time zone: UTC+1 (CET)
  - Summer (DST): UTC+2 (CEST)

Miškovice is a cadastral area in Prague, Czech Republic.
