= Bank Austria =

Austrian subsidiary of the UniCredit Group

UniCredit Bank Austria AG

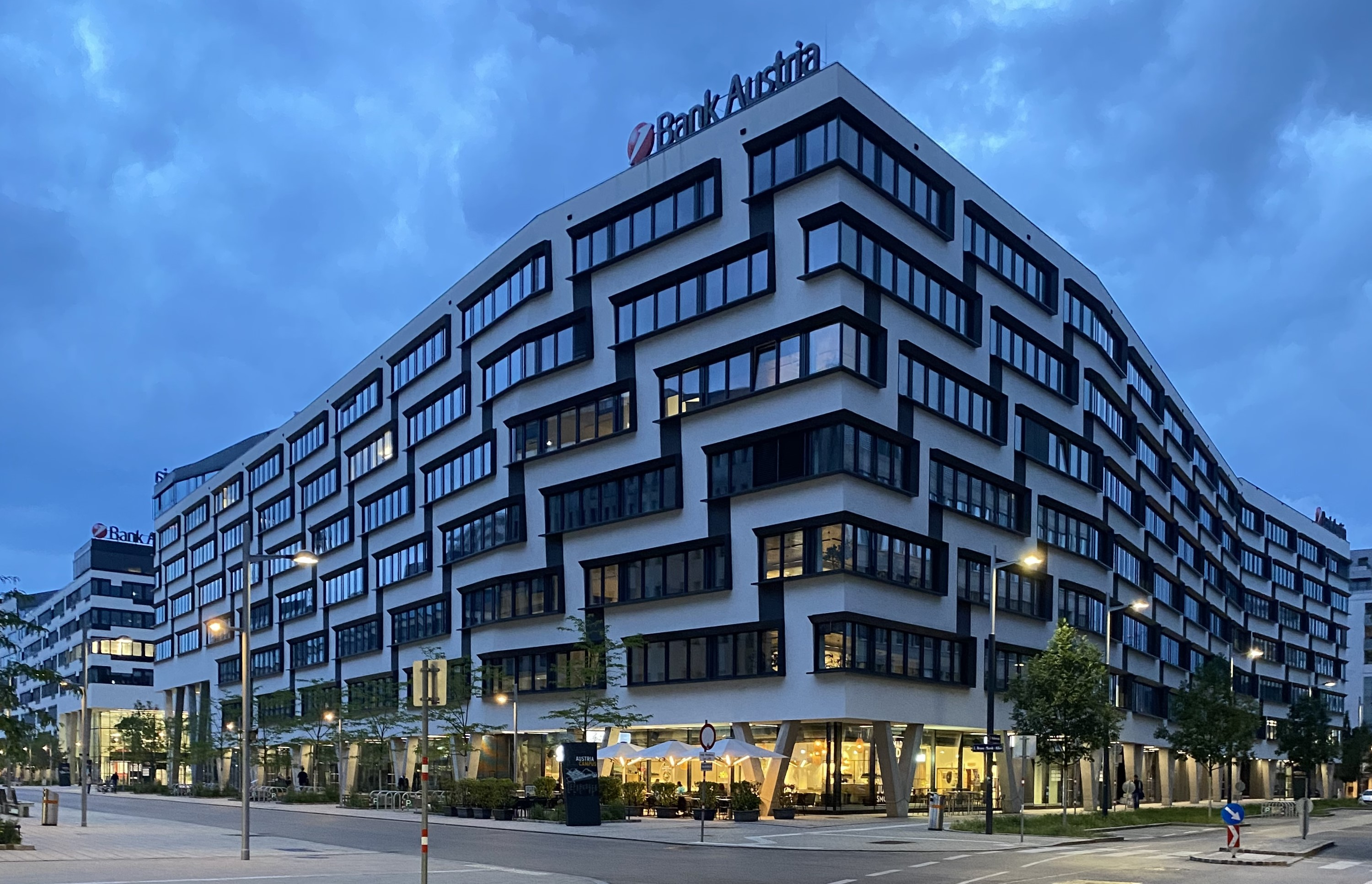
- Austria Campus complex in Vienna, head office of Bank Austria since 2018
- Type: Subsidiary
- Industry: Financial services
- Founded: September 18, 1996; 29 years ago (1855 as Österreichische Credit-Anstalt für Handel und Gwerbe)
- Headquarters: Vienna, Austria
- Key people: Ivan Vlaho (CEO); Gianfranco Bisagni (chairman)
- Products: Retail and Commercial banking; Investment banking; Private banking; Asset management
- Operating income: €1.993 million (2022)
- Net income: €823 million (2022)
- Total assets: €107.3 billion (as of year-end 2022)
- Total equity: €9.4 billion (2022)
- Number of employees: 4,872 (Full-time equivalents/FTE, as of year-end 2022)
- Subsidiaries: Schoellerbank
- Website: www.bankaustria.at

UniCredit Bank Austria AG, branded and widely referred to as Bank Austria, is an Austrian bank, 99,9965% owned by Milan-based pan-European banking group UniCredit. Bank Austria was formed in 1991 by merger of Länderbank and Vienna's Zentralsparkasse, acquired Creditanstalt-Bankverein in 1997, and merged with it to form Bank Austria-Creditanstalt (BA-CA) in 2002. Its name reverted to Bank Austria in 2008, as UniCredit, the bank's owner since 2005, phased out the history-laden Creditanstalt brand.

== History ==
Bank Austria was formed in 1991 by the merger of the troubled Länderbank and Vienna's Zentralsparkasse, in practice a takeover of the former by the latter led by its general director René Alfons Haiden; the merged entity became Austria's largest bank. In 1996, the Austrian government announced the privatization of Creditanstalt-Bankverein, in which it held a majority stake. In January 1997, Bank Austria acquired the stake for about 1.25 billion euros. In turn, Bank Austria sold a majority stake it held in GiroCredit for 8.24 billion schillings (about 600 million euros) to Erste Bank. In February 1998, the state sold its last shares and the remaining shares on the market were exchanged with shares in Bank Austria, and Creditanstalt was delisted from the Vienna Stock Exchange.

In stages from 2000 to 2002, HVB Group took over Bank Austria. Subsequently in 2002, Bank Austria's shares were delisted, and Bank Austria and Creditanstalt merged to form Bank Austria-Creditanstalt. An assets exchange procedure led to the transfert of HVB's assets in central and eastern Europe to Bank Austria, and reversely. The new BA-CA's shares were offered to the public through an IPO in 2003.

In June 2005 Italian group UniCredit announced the acquisition of HypoVereinsbank, along with BA-CA. Restructuring led to the creation of a new holding for BA-CA foreign assets in eastern Europe, the transformation of the Polish activity to a full affiliate, the shrinking of BA-CA per se to a smaller market, and the shrinking of HVB to the German market. In order to respect cartel restriction in Croatia, BA-CA's affiliate Splitska banka was sold to Société Générale, for UniCredit already owned Zagrebačka banka. BA-CA acquired Koç Finansal Hizmetler (Turkey), Zagrebačka banka (Croatia), Bulbank (Bulgaria), Živnostenska banka (Czechia), UniBanka (Slovakia) and UniCredit Romania from UniCredit in that operation.

In 2006 BA-CA continued its expansion in Russia by acquiring remaining shares in International Moscow Bank and 100% of institutional business of Aton Capital - a Russian brokerage. Moreover, Kazakh bank ATFBank was acquired in 2007.

Since 31 March 2008, the bank has been operating under the brand name "Bank Austria" and has a new logo to show the connection to the UniCredit Group. It had the strongest capital base among the large banks in Austria, its Core Tier 1 ratio amounted to 10.55% and its Total Capital ratio to 12.7% as of 31 December 2011.

In 2016, UniCredit took back from Bank Austria direct ownership of its affiliates in Central and Eastern Europe.

From 2016 to 2024, Bank Austria was managed by Robert Zadrazil as CEO. In 2024, Zadrazil became Country Manager of UniCredit in Austria, with Ivan Vlaho taking over as CEO of Bank Austria. In 2025, UniCredit announced that Zadrazil would leave UniCredit and that Vlaho would additionally assume the role of Country Manager.

== Controversy ==
The 2000s saw the bank in the middle of substantial litigation around trustee Rudolfine Steindling's transfer of former East German, now German, money to her own accounts. In 2010 a Swiss court ruled that the predecessor Länderbank had broken the law by aiding her to channel away the money and had to pay €240 million but a higher court overruled this decision on formal grounds.

== See also ==
- Schoellerbank
- Banking in Austria
- List of banks in Austria
- List of investors in Bernard L. Madoff Securities
