= Čakovice =

Čakovice Čakovice
- Municipal District of Prague; Cadastral Area of Prague
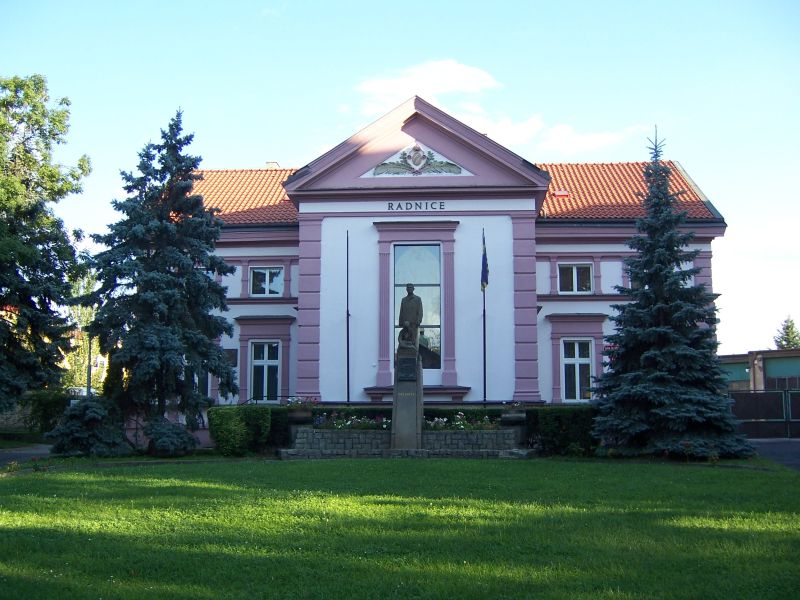
- Praha-Čakovice town hall

- Flag Coat of arms

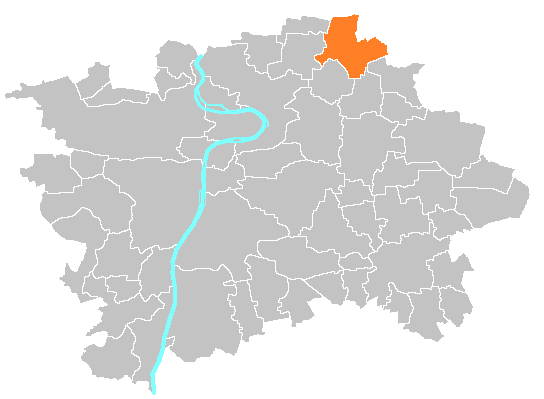
- Location of Čakovice in Prague
- Coordinates: 50°9′4″N 14°31′29″E
- Country: Czech Republic
- Region: Prague
- District: Prague 18

Government
  - Mayor: Alena Samková

Area
  - Total: 10.19 km^{2} (3.93 sq mi)

Population (2021)
  - Total: 11,984
  - Density: 1,176/km^{2} (3,046/sq mi)
- Time zone: UTC+1 (CET)
  - Summer (DST): UTC+2 (CEST)
- Postal code: 196 00
- Website: http://www.cakovice.cz

Čakovice (German Tschakowitz) is a municipal district (městská část) in Prague. It is located in the north-eastern part of the city. As of 2021, there were 11,984 inhabitants living in Čakovice. The municipal district consists of three cadastral areas (katastrální území): Čakovice, Miškovice and Třeboradice.

The Čakovice cadastre has an area of 3.83 km^{2} and a population of about 8,000 inhabitants.

The first written record of Čakovice is from the 11th century. The town became part of Prague in 1968.

== Demographics ==
Historical population
Year	Pop.	±%
1869	1,664	—
1880	2,269	+36.4%
1890	2,867	+26.4%
1900	2,949	+2.9%
1910	3,017	+2.3%
1921	2,981	−1.2%
1930	4,469	+49.9%
1950	5,746	+28.6%
1961	6,868	+19.5%
1970	7,041	+2.5%
1980	6,282	−10.8%
1991	5,561	−11.5%
2001	5,681	+2.2%
2011	10,379	+82.7%
2021	11,984	+15.5%
Source: Censuses

== Sport ==
TJ Avia Čakovice are a football team that play at the Letňa Avia, off Ke Stadionu 705. In 1971, the Victoria Speedway Club Praha began racing motorcycle speedway at the venue, originally called Zizkov Prague before taking the name AMK Čakovice in the late 1970s. The venue also hosted a final round of the Czechoslovak Individual Championship eight times from 1973 to 1983.
