= Schoeller-Bleckmann Oilfield Equipment =

Austrian engineering company

SBO AG
- Type: Aktiengesellschaft
- Traded as: WBAG: SBO; ATX Index component
- ISIN: AT0000946652
- Industry: Percision Technology
- Founded: 1988
- Headquarters: Ternitz, Lower Austria, Austria
- Key people: Klaus Mader (CEO)
- Products: Oilfield equipment
- Revenue: 560.4 Mio. Euro (2024)
- Website: www.sbo.at

SBO AG is an Austrian engineering company that specializes in the production of high-precision components and equipment for the oil and gas industry. SBO products include drill bits, downhole tools, and other specialized equipment used in the exploration and production of oil and gas.

== Background ==
It is a former subdivision of the Schoeller-Bleckmann group, a manufacturer particularly of steel products which was nationalised in 1946; the company was spun off in the period 1993-7. The company is based in Ternitz, south-west of Vienna. As of October 2015, it is a member of the Austrian Traded Index, the index of the twenty largest companies traded on the Vienna stock exchange. A subdivision is named Schoeller-Bleckmann Oilfield Technology.

== Criticism ==
Schoeller-Bleckmann has faced criticism for continuing its operations in Russia despite the country's ongoing invasion of Ukraine. This decision has drawn attention due to international sanctions imposed on Russia and widespread condemnation of the war, which has resulted in significant civilian casualties and destruction in Ukraine. Critics argue that the company's presence in Russia undermines global efforts to isolate the aggressor state economically and diplomatically.

== See also ==
- List of oilfield service companies
