= Richard von Schoeller =

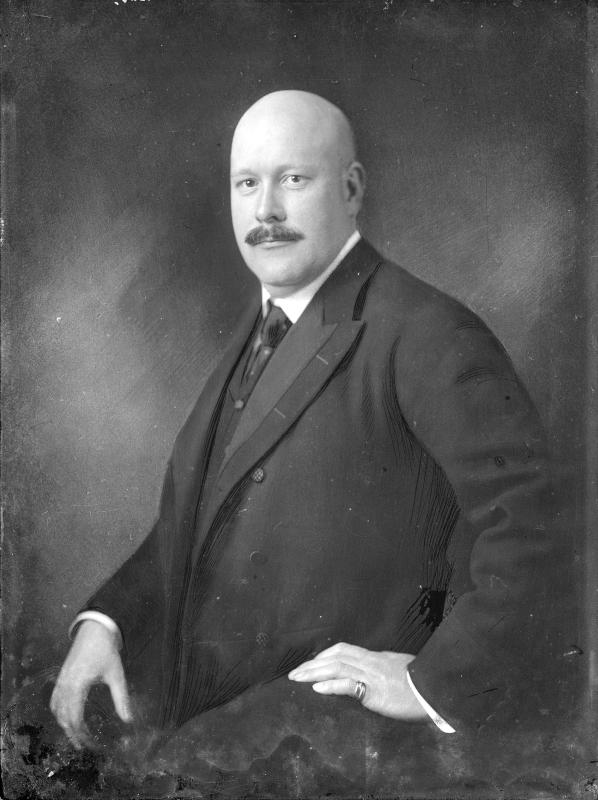
- Schoeller c. 1920
- Born: 13 August 1871; Groß-Čakovice
- Died: 22 June 1950 (aged 78); Vienna, Austria
- Education: University of Halle
- Spouse: Emmi Siedenburg (m. 1894; died 1950)
- Children: Princess Felicitas of Hohenlohe-Schillingsfürst
- Parent(s): Philipp Johann von Schoeller; Idaliese von Schickh

Richard Ritter von Schoeller (from 1919 Richard Schoeller; 13 August 1871 – 22 June 1950) was an Austrian banker and industrialist in the mining industry.

== Early life ==
Schoeller was born on 13 August 1871 in Groß-Čakovice, near Prague, into the Brno branch of the Schoeller family. He was the son of the Moravian industrialist Philipp Johann von Schoeller (1835–1892) and Idaliese Edle von Schickh (d. 1896).

After attending the German state school in Prague, he studied agricultural sciences at the University of Halle in Halle, as Richard and his brother Philipp Josef von Schoeller (1864–1906) were to take over the management of their father's sugar factories in Groß-Čakovice, Čáslav and Vrdy.

== Career ==
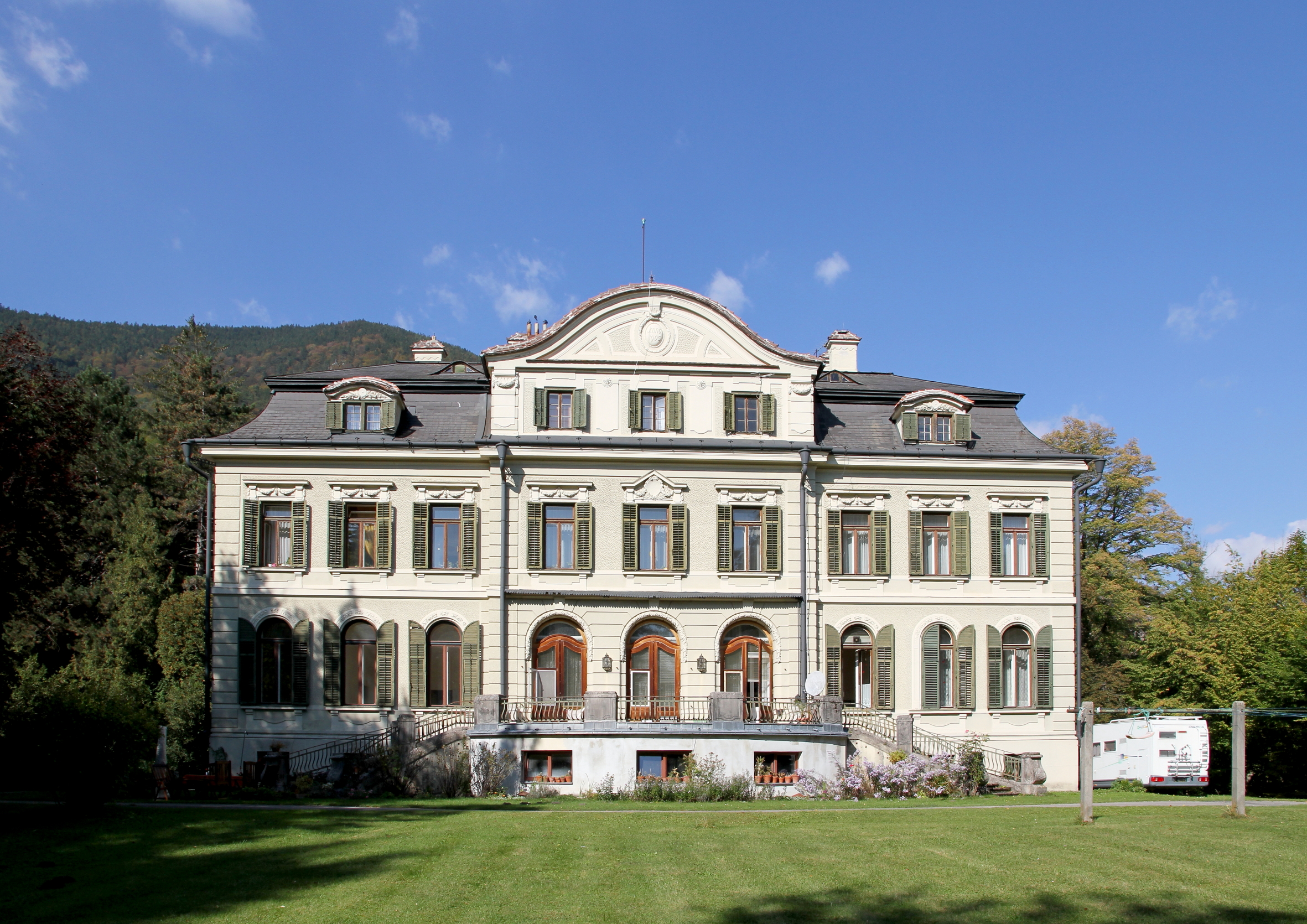
Villa Schoeller in Hirschwang

From 1900, like most family members, he joined the Viennese wholesale and trading company Schoeller & Co., later known as Schoellerbank, initially as a partner. Soon afterwards, his cousin from the Viennese line of the family, Sir Paul Eduard von Schoeller, appointed him to the management of Ternitzer Steel and Iron Works, founded by Alexander von Schoeller. In order to continue the expansion of the Schoeller steelworks already driven by Paul Eduard, Richard set up numerous branches and his own sales subsidiary to supply the German market. He also temporarily integrated the steelworks of Prince Johann Adolf von Schwarzenberg in Vordernberg and Trofaiach into his company, but closed them down in 1911. He also took over the hammer and rolling mills in Murau and Unzmarkt-Frauenburg as well as the Schoeller & Co. wood grinding mill, wood pulp factory and cardboard factory in the Hirschwang district of Reichenau an der Rax, which he sold to Neusiedler AG in 1916.

After Paul Eduard's death in 1920, Richard became the sole heir of the family's business empire, including the Schoellerbank and the various sugar, beer and grain factories. In this capacity, his next important step in 1924 was the merger of the Bleckmann steelworks in Mürzzuschlag with the Ternitzer Schoeller steelworks to form Schoeller-Bleckmann Steelworks, and he took over the office of president. As heir and director of the Ebenfurther Rolled Barley Factory, also founded by Alexander von Schoeller in 1853, which had already been merged with the First Viennese Vonwiller Rolling Mill in 1894, he pushed through the merger of the Bäckermühle am Schüttel and the Kellnermühle in Schwechat to form Getreide AG of Schoeller & Co. In 1926, as president of the Hütteldorfer brewery, he arranged for the takeover of the United Schwechat Breweries, Sankt Marx, Simmering, which at the time was the third largest brewery in Europe.

== Personal life ==
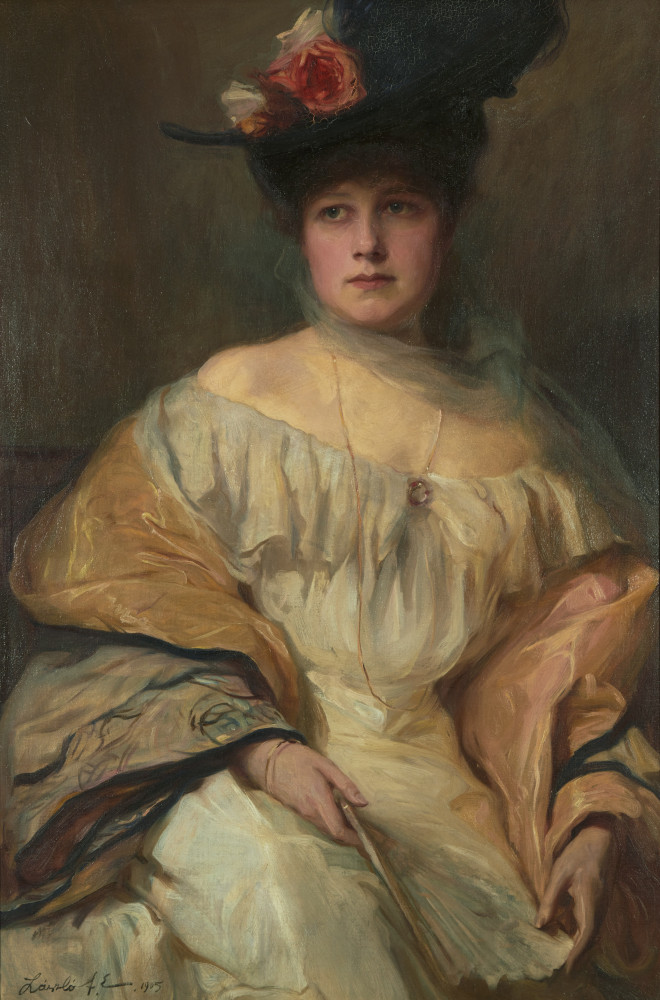
Portrait of his wife, Emmi Siedenburg, by Philip de László, 1905

On 11 December 1894, Schoeller was married to Emmi Frederika Siedenburg (1873–1956) at Brighton Heights Reformed Church in Staten Island. She was a daughter of German born American merchant Reinhard Siedenburg, president of the New York Cotton Exchange who founded the cotton brokerage firm, Reinhard Siedenberg & Company (which failed in 1932), and Henriette (née Heitmann) Siedenberg. Together, they were the parents of:

- Felicitas Aletta Mechthild von Schoeller (1900–1975), who married American steel manufacturer James Wendell Southard. After his death in 1927, she married banker and diplomat Prince Alfred of Hohenlohe-Schillingsfürst, widower of Catherine Britton (a daughter of Alexander B. Britton) and son of the Austrian politician and Prime Minister Prince Konrad of Hohenlohe-Schillingsfürst. Prince Alfred's youngest sister, Princess Franziska, was the wife of Archduke Maximilian of Austria (brother of Archduke Karl Franz of Austria, the last Emperor of Austria).

Since Schoeller had no male issue, his nephew Philipp Alois (the son of his brother Philipp Josef), was chosen as the sole heir to the family's business empire as early as 1933 due to Richard's serious illness. As early as 1911, Richard von Schoeller arranged for his two cousins, Maj. Friedrich von Schoeller and the sugar industrialist Robert von Schoeller (sons of the Brno cloth manufacturer Alois Philipp Schoeller), to be given the title of nobility. The titles, however, were lost again after World War I with the Law on the Abolition of Nobility in 1919 after which the family members have only borne the name Schoeller without the "von". Schoeller died 22 June 1950 in Vienna.

=== Descendants ===
Through his daughter Felicitas, he was a grandfather of Sylvia Southard (1926–2004), who married American philanthropist John Meyer Tiedtke, a son of Ernest Tiedtke of the Ohio grocery and department store Tiedtke's.
