= Harry W. Rusk =

American politician (1852–1926)

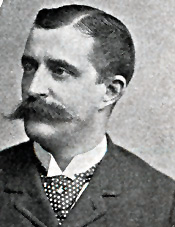

Member of the U.S. House of Representatives from Maryland's 3rd district
- In office December 6, 1886 – March 3, 1897
- Preceded by: William Hinson Cole
- Succeeded by: William Samuel Booze

Personal details
- Born: Harry Welles Rusk; 17 October 1852 Baltimore, Maryland, U.S.
- Died: 28 January 1926 (aged 73) Baltimore, Maryland, U.S.
- Resting place: Green Mount Cemetery
- Spouse: Isabelle Whitmore Adams (after 1880)
- Children: H. Welles Rusk Jr.
- Education: Baltimore City College
- Alma mater: University of Maryland School of Law

Harry Welles Rusk (October 17, 1852 – January 28, 1926) was a U.S. representative from the third district of Maryland. He was also the president of the Kennard Novelty Company in Baltimore. This was the first company to commercially sell ouija boards in 1890.

== Early life ==
Rusk was born in Baltimore, Maryland on October 17, 1852. He was the son of Jacob Krebs Rusk (1823–1913) and Catharine Olivia Rusk (1829–1902). Among his siblings were Dr. George Glanville Rusk and Jacob Krebs Rusk Jr.

He attended private school for his primary education. In 1866 Rusk graduated from high school from Baltimore City College. Rusk obtained a law degree from the University of Maryland School of Law in 1872 and was admitted to the bar in 1873.

== Career ==
Following his admission to the Maryland State Bar, Rusk began practicing law in Baltimore. Rusk served in the Maryland House of Delegates from 1876 to 1880. Subsequently, Rusk was elected and served in the Maryland State Senate from 1882 to 1884. In 1884, Rusk served as a delegate to the Democratic National Convention. Following the death of William H. Cole, Rusk was elected as a Democrat to the U.S. House of Representatives for the 49th United States Congress. Rusk served for five subsequent terms. In the 52nd Congress and 53rd Congress, Rusk was chairman of the Committee on Accounts.

After declining to run for reelection in 1896, Rusk became chairman of the Democratic State central committee for Baltimore. Rusk served in this capacity from 1898 to 1908. Thereafter, Rusk resumed practicing law in Baltimore.

== Personal life ==
On December 16, 1880, Rusk was married to Isabelle Whitmore Adams. Together, they were the parents of one son:

- Harry Welles Rusk Jr. (1885–1937), a Commander in the U.S. Navy who married Margaret Britton, youngest daughter of Alexander B. Britton, in 1915. Her elder sister, Catherine, married Prince Alfred of Hohenlohe-Schillingsfürst (eldest son of Prince Konrad of Hohenlohe-Schillingsfürst and Countess Franziska von Schönborn-Buchheim).

Rusk died in Baltimore on January 28, 1926 and was interred in Green Mount Cemetery.

== Sources ==
- The Official Website of William Fuld and home of the Ouija board
- Biography of Harry Welles Rusk

U.S. House of Representatives
Preceded by William Hinson Cole	Member of the U.S. House of Representatives from Maryland's 3rd congressional district 1886–1897	Succeeded by William Samuel Booze
