= Archduke Maximilian =

Archduke Maximilian may refer to:

- Maximilian I, Holy Roman Emperor (1459–1519)
- Archduke Maximilian Ernest of Austria (1583–1616)
- Archduke Maximilian Francis of Austria (1756–1801)
- Emperor Maximilian I of Mexico (1832–1867)
- Archduke Maximilian of Austria-Este (1782–1863)
- Archduke Maximilian of Austria (1895–1952)
