= Woodlawn Cemetery (Toledo, Ohio) =

- U.S. National Register of Historic Places
- U.S. Historic district
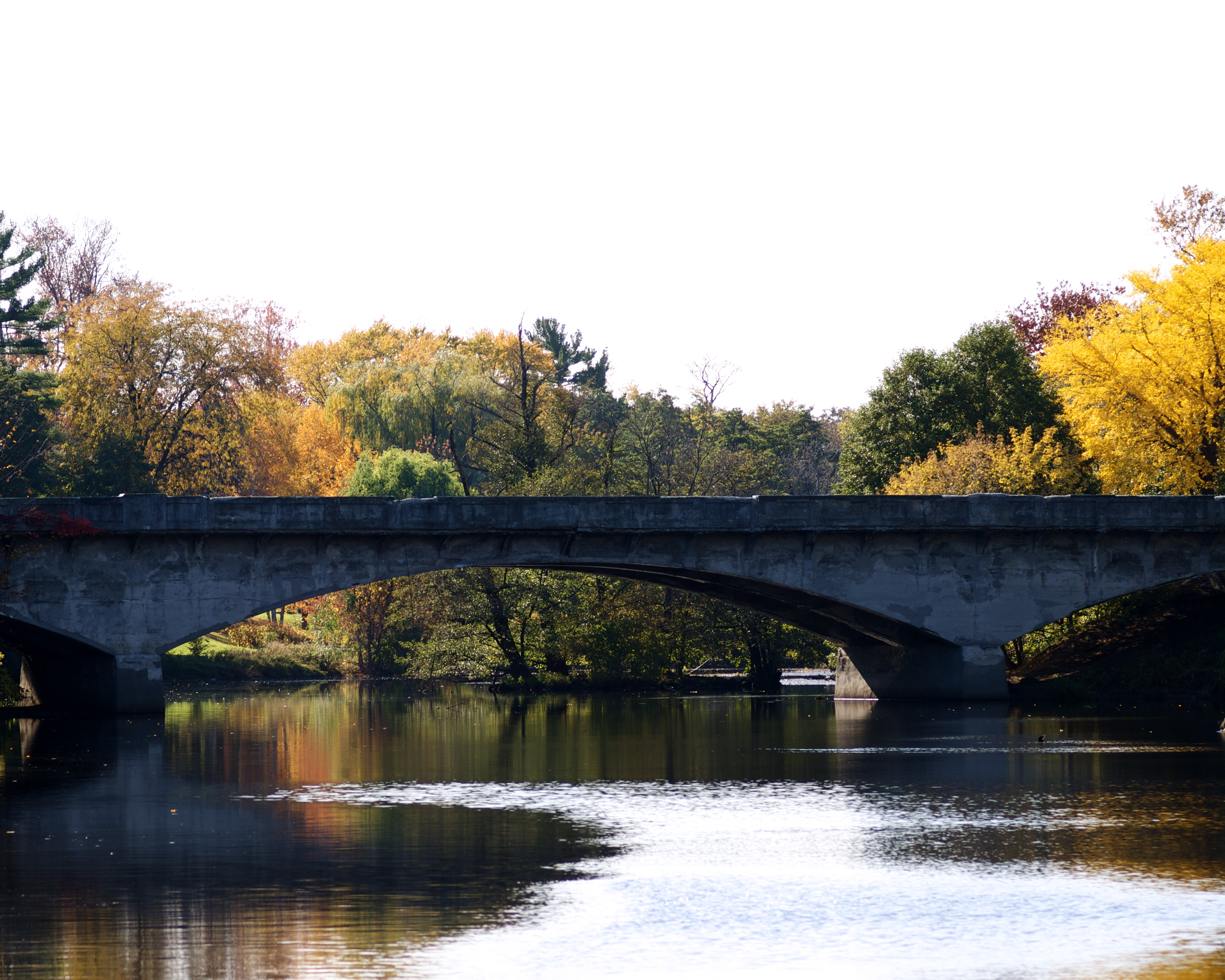
- Bridge over Silver Lake

- Location within Ohio Location within the United States
- Location: 1502 W. Central Ave., Toledo, Ohio
- Coordinates: 41°40′53″N 83°34′46″W
- Built: 1876
- Architect: Eurich, Frank; et al.
- Architectural style: Classical Revival, Late Gothic Revival
- NRHP reference No.: 98001396
- Added to NRHP: November 19, 1998

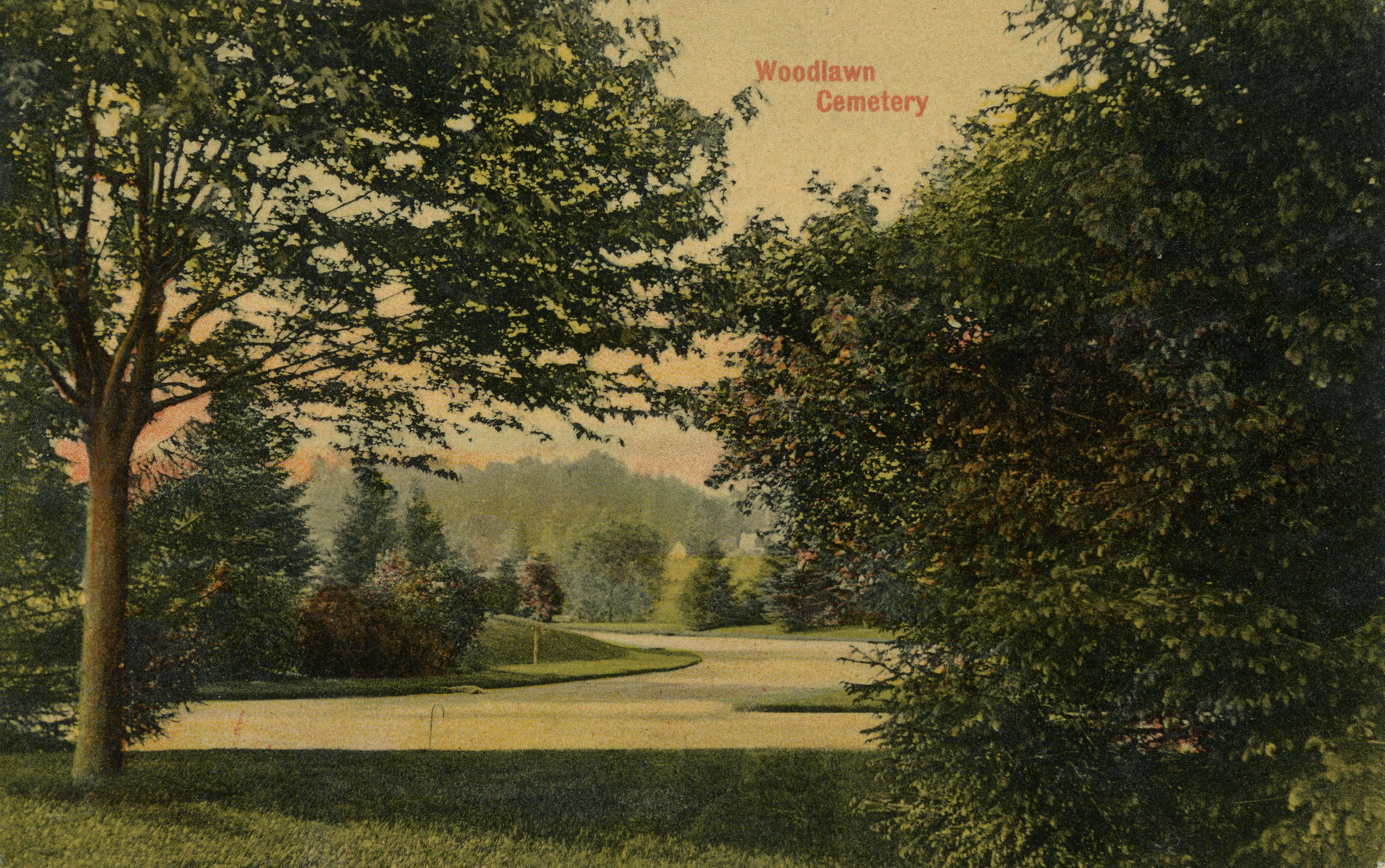
Woodlawn Cemetery, Toledo, Ohio, 1920

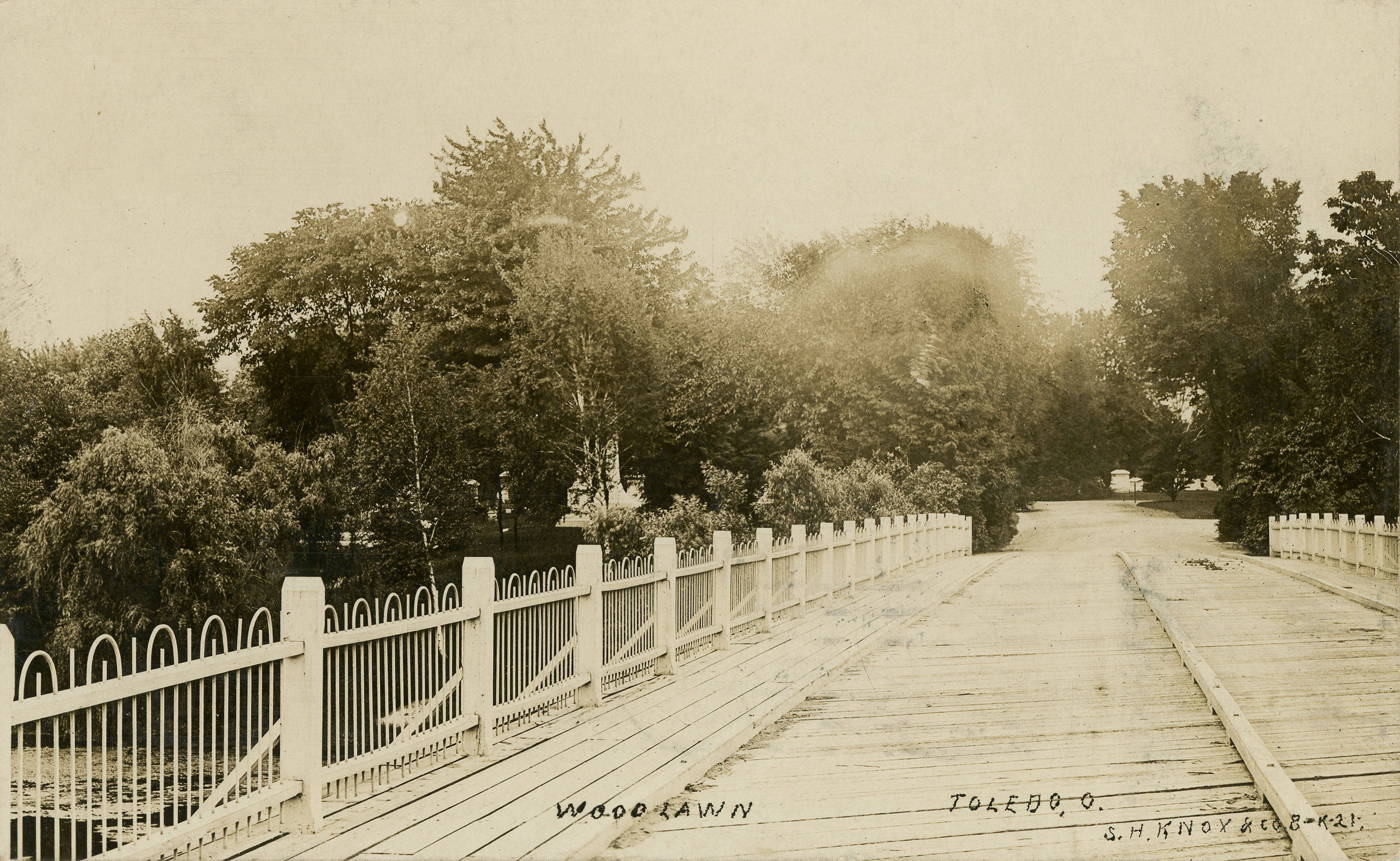
Woodlawn Cemetery, Toledo, Ohio, 1908

Woodlawn Cemetery is a rural cemetery and arboretum located in Toledo, Ohio. It is one of several cemeteries in the United States to have that name, and one of a few to be on the National Register of Historic Places.

Established in 1876, it sits on 160 acres (0.65 km^{2}) of land, 47 acres (190,000 m^{2}) are undeveloped, and consists of 65,000 interments.

== Notable interments ==
- Christian Albert (1842–1922), Medal of Honor recipient
- Horace Newton Allen (1858–1932), missionary, physician, and American ambassador to Korea
- James Mitchell Ashley (1824–1896), Member of the United States House of Representatives
- Lud Ashley (1923–2010), Member of the United States House of Representatives
- Walter Folger Brown (1869–1961) 49th Postmaster General
- Lave Cross (1866–1927), Baseball player
- Charles Doolittle (1832–1903), Civil War general
- John H. Doyle (1844–1919), Associate Justice of the Ohio Supreme Court
- John W. Fuller (1827–1891), Civil War brevet major general
- Steve Gordon (1938–1982), screenwriter and film director (Arthur)
- William T. Jackson (1876–1933), mayor of Toledo from 1928 to 1931
- Samuel M. Jones (1846−1904), Progressive Era mayor of Toledo
- Addie Joss (1880–1911), Baseball Hall Of Fame pitcher
- David Ross Locke (1833–1888), Civil War journalist and commentator
- Frazier Reams (1897−1971), U.S. Representative
- Isaac R. Sherwood (1835–1925), Member of the United States House of Representatives
- James B. Steedman (1817–1883), Union Army Civil War General
- David L. Stine (1857–1941), architect
- Myles Thomas (1897–1963), MLB pitcher
- John Tiedtke (1907–2004), philanthropist, farmer, and scion of the founder of Tiedtke's
- Morrison Waite (1816–1888), 7th Chief Justice of the United States

== See also ==
- List of burial places of justices of the Supreme Court of the United States
