= Alexander B. Britton =

American lawyer (1867–1926)

- Born: January 1, 1867; Washington D.C., U.S.
- Died: June 24, 1926 (aged 59); Chevy Chase, Maryland, U.S.
- Resting place: Oak Hill Cemetery
- Alma mater: Princeton University; George Washington University Law School
- Occupation: Attorney
- Spouse(s): Louise Schneider Reed (m. 1889; died 1917) Marjorie Savin Pilson (m. 1923; died 1926)
- Children: Princess Catherine of Hohenlohe-Schillingsfürst; Margaret Rusk
- Parent(s): Alexander Thompson Britton; Mary Crandall Wilcox

Alexander B. Britton (January 1, 1867 – June 24, 1926) was an American lawyer with the firm Britton & Gray.

== Early life ==
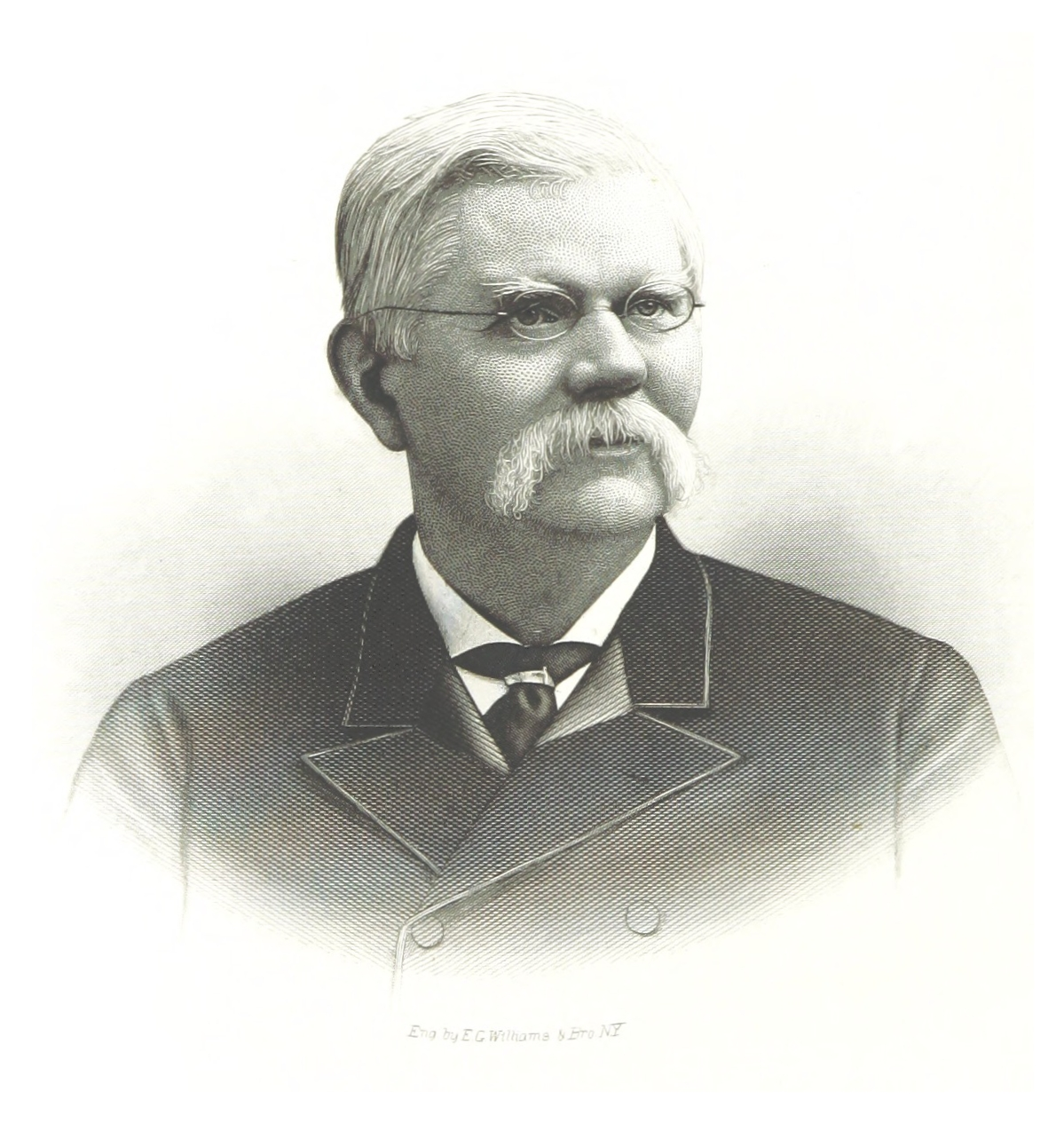
Engraving of his father, Alexander T. Britton

Britton was born in Washington, D.C., on January 1, 1867. He was a son of Col. Alexander Thompson Britton (1835–1899) and Mary Crandall Wilcox (1833–1868). Among his siblings were Susan Britton (wife of Jesse Bright Ould), Mary Heins "Daisy" Britton, and Belle Britton (wife of Walter Allan Galt). After his mother's death in 1868, his father married Mary Ann Martin in 1869. From his father's second marriage, Alexander had several half-siblings, including Martin Britton (who married Susan Felicia Kirby), William Lee Britton (who married Mayday Louise Walker), Sadie Britton (wife of Joseph Nelson Thompson), and Flora Britton (wife of Arthur Dudley Carpenter).

His paternal grandparents were Alexander Britton and Susan (née Towers) Britton of New York City. His maternal grandparents were Isaac Wilcox Jr. and Clarissa Richmond (née Brownell) Wilcox of Providence, Rhode Island.

Britton attended Princeton University before attending law school at Columbian University (today known as George Washington University).

== Career ==
Britton joined the law firm started by his father in 1864, eventually becoming senior partner. Like his father before him, Britton was considered a leader of the Washington bar and was a member of the Washington Board of Trade.

He was a director of the Federal-American National Bank and the Merchants' Transfer and Storage Company, and served as Secretary-Treasurer of the Capital Garage Company.

=== Club life ===
A prominent club man, Britton served as president, and a member of the Board of Governors, of the Chevy Chase Club in Maryland. He was also a member of the Metropolitan Club, the Racquet Club, and the Blue Ridge Rod and Gun Club.

== Personal life ==
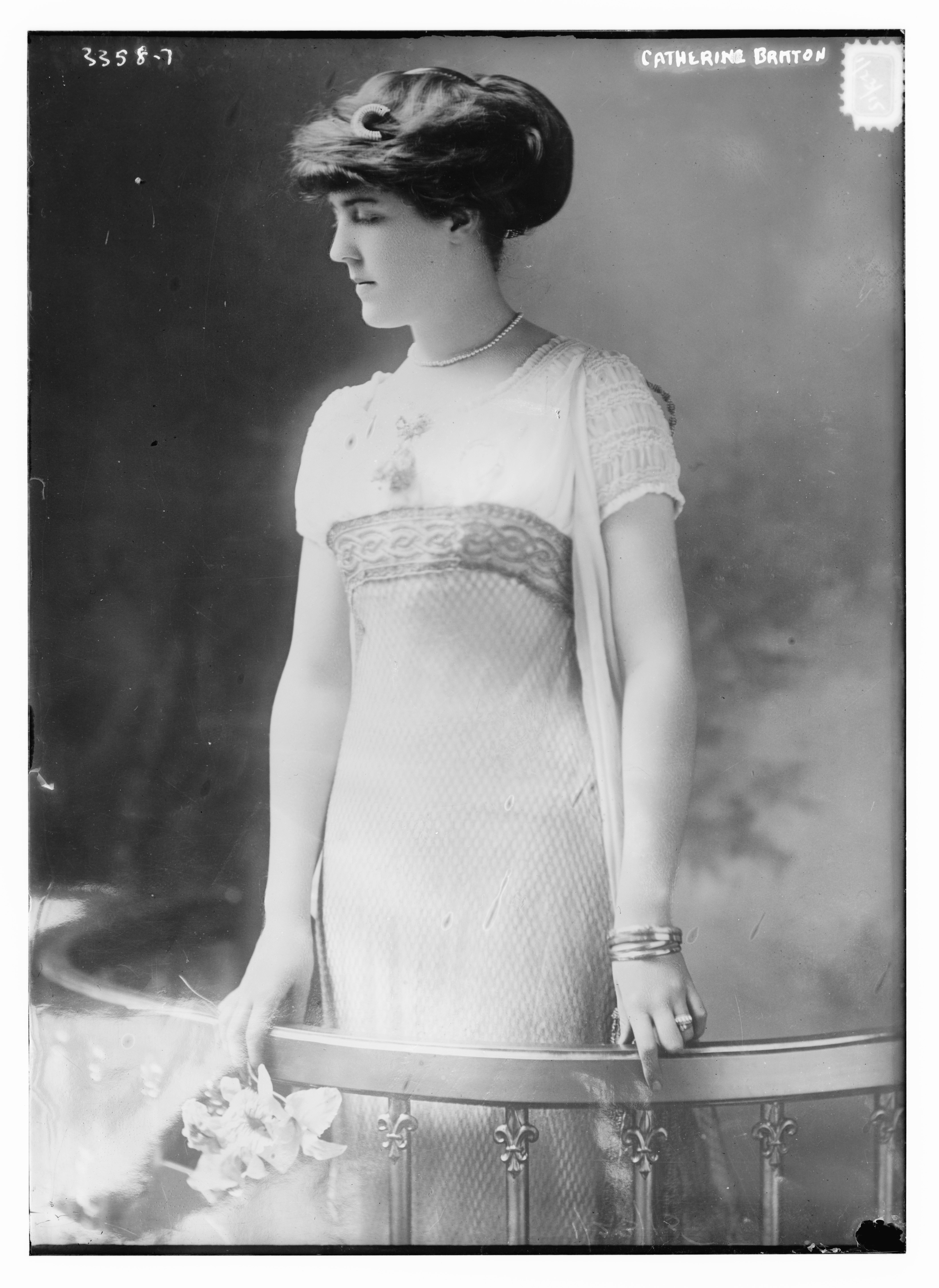
Photograph of his daughter, Princess Catherine of Hohenlohe-Schillingsfürst

On October 23, 1889, Britton married Louise Schneider Reed (1869–1917), a daughter of William Bushrod Reed and Catharine Augusta Schneider. Before her death on January 23, 1917, they were the parents of:

- Catherine Britton (1892–1929), who married Prince Alfred of Hohenlohe-Schillingsfürst, son of Prince Konrad of Hohenlohe-Schillingsfürst and Countess Franziska von Schönborn-Buchheim, in 1916. Prince Alfred's youngest sister, Princess Franziska, was the wife of Archduke Maximilian of Austria (brother of Archduke Karl Franz of Austria, the last Emperor of Austria). After her death, Prince Alfred married Felicitas Aletta Mechthild (née von Schoeller) Southard, a daughter of Ritter Richard von Schoeller and widow of James Wendell Southard, before his death in a plane crash over South Ayrshire, Scotland in 1948.
- Margaret Britton (1895–1958), who married Commander H. Welles Rusk Jr. of the U.S. Navy, son of U.S. Representative Harry Welles Rusk, in 1915.

After his first wife's death, shortly after their eldest daughter's wedding to Prince Alfred, Britton married Marjorie (née Savin) Pilson (1891–1951) on December 1, 1923, at his home at Chevy Chase, Maryland. She was previously married to Edward H. Pilson. From her first marriage, she was the mother of Marjorie (née Pilson) Faust, Elaine (née Pilson) Castle, and Nancy (née Pilson) Hawkins).

Britton died on June 24, 1926, in Chevy Chase, Maryland. He was buried at Oak Hill Cemetery in Washington. After his death, his widow married Count Ippolito Salvoni of Florence, Italy on June 21, 1927.

=== Descendants ===
Through his daughter Catherine, he was a grandfather of Prince Alexander Konrad of Hohenlohe-Schillingsfürst (1918–1984), who married Margaret Boyce Schulze in 1939 (a granddaughter of industrialist William Boyce Thompson and stepdaughter of Ambassador Anthony Joseph Drexel Biddle Jr., they divorced and Margaret married singer Morton Downey); and Prince Konrad Maximilian Alfred of Hohenlohe-Waldenburg-Schillingsfürst (1919–1943), who married Ladislaja Mayr von Melnhof (after his death she married Count Johann Jakob Eltz).
