= James Southard =

James Southard may refer to:

- James H. Southard, American lawyer and politician
- James Wendell Southard, American businessman
