= Patricia Wilder =

American actress (1915–1993)

Patricia Hohenlohe
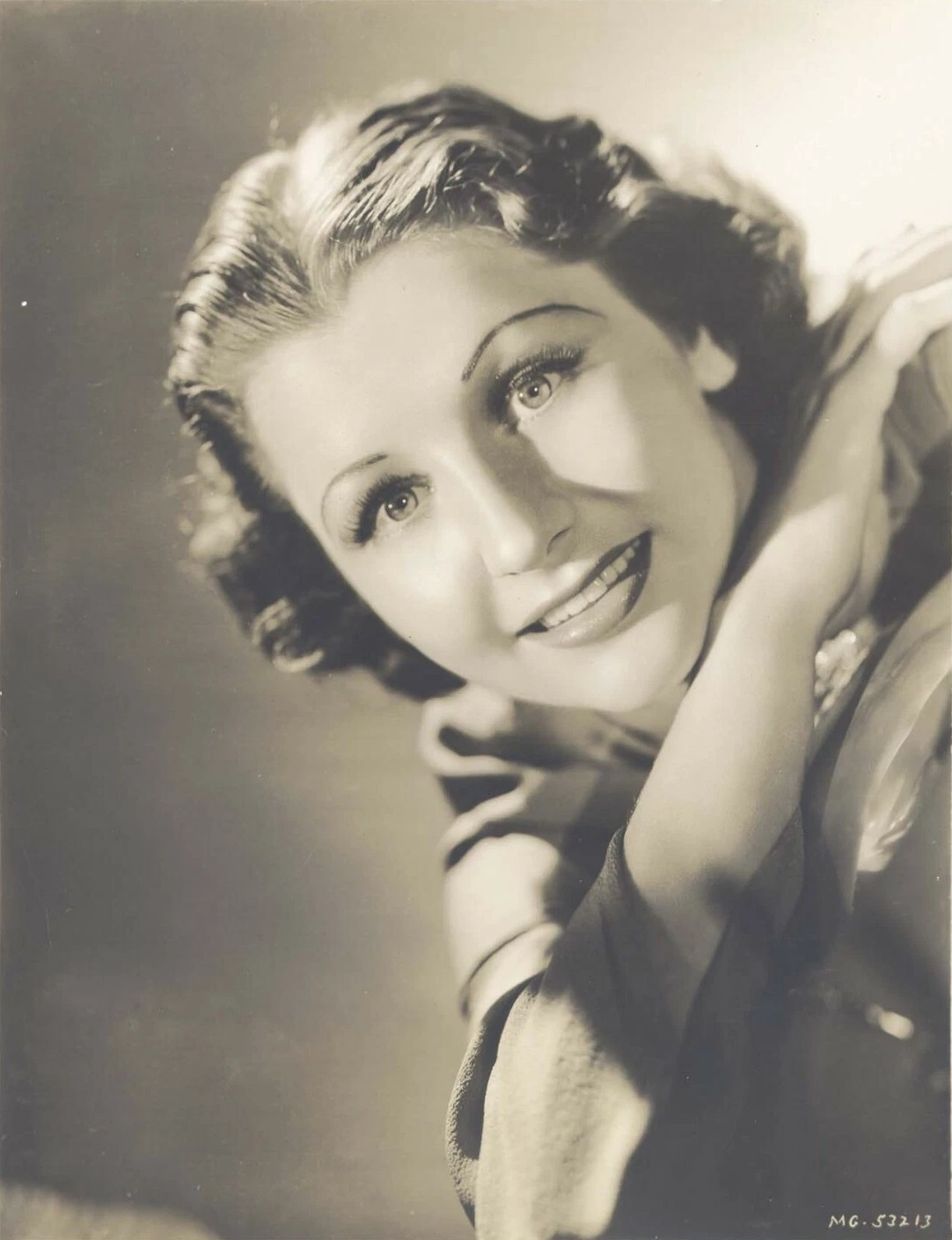
- Wilder in Speed (1936)
- Born: Patricia Wilder; September 8, 1913; Macon, Georgia, U.S.
- Died: August 11, 1995 (aged 81); New York City, U.S.
- Spouses: Robin Harris (m. 1935, divorced) Albert Cernadas (m. 1941, divorced) Prince Alexander zu Hohenlohe-Waldenburg-Schillingsfürst (m. 1951; died 1984)

Patricia Anne zu Hohenlohe-Waldenburg-Schillingsfürst (née Patricia Wilder) (September 8, 1913 – August 11, 1995) was an American film actress of the late 1930s.

== Early life ==
Wilder was born on September 8, 1913, in Macon, Georgia. She was a daughter of Oscar Owen Wilder and Laura Bryant (née Watson) Wilder. She grew up with 12 brothers and sisters.

== Career ==
She made her way to Hollywood via New York City by the mid-1930s to pursue a career in acting. She had first worked as a showgirl for Bob Hope while in New York City, in the Palace Theater.

She received her first film role in 1936, having a minor part alongside James Stewart in Speed. She followed this with two uncredited roles that same year, as well as a credited role alongside Gloria Stuart and Lee Tracy in Wanted! Jane Turner. She stayed in close alliance with Bob Hope, working for him on radio shows during her entire career, and had her first film role alongside him in the 1936 film Walking on Air.

She had two film appearances in 1937, the first in a minor role in the film New Faces of 1937, which starred Milton Berle and Joe Penner, among others, and the second in On Again-Off Again alongside Marjorie Lord and Robert Woolsey. In 1938 she had minor roles in four films, the biggest of which was My Lucky Star, starring Buddy Ebsen and Cesar Romero, along with a Shirley Temple film, Little Miss Broadway. Her last film was Bob Hope's Thanks for the Memory, starring Bob Hope and Shirley Ross.

She acquired the nickname "Honeychile" from her habit of referring to people by this name.

== Later years and death ==
In 1935, she married reporter Robin "Curly" Harris. Her second husband was Albert Cernadas, an Argentine millionaire, whom she wed in 1941.

For a time in the 1940s she was in a relationship with King Farouk of Egypt, who she stated in an interview that of all her lovers, he was the one who had the best sense of humour and made her laugh the most.

On 21 May 1951 in Greenwich, Connecticut, she married her third husband, Prince Alexander zu Hohenlohe-Waldenburg-Schillingsfürst. He was a son of Austrian diplomat Prince Alfred of Hohenlohe-Schillingsfürst and the former Catharine Britton of Washington D.C. (a daughter of Alexander B. Britton). They remained married until his death in 1984.

Honeychile died in New York City in 1995.
