= Charles Doolittle =

Charles Camp Doolittle
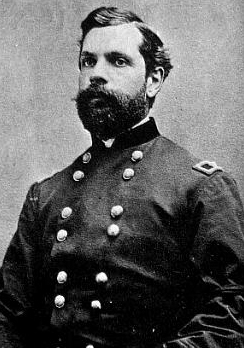
- Charles Camp Doolittle
- Born: March 16, 1832; Burlington, Vermont
- Died: February 20, 1903 (aged 70); Toledo, Ohio
- Burial place: Woodlawn Cemetery, Toledo, Ohio
- Military career
- Allegiance: United States of America; Union
- Branch: United States Army; Union Army
- Service years: 1861 - 1865
- Rank: Brigadier General; Brevet Major General
- Conflicts: American Civil War

Charles Camp Doolittle (March 16, 1832 – February 20, 1903) was a store clerk, general in the Union Army during the American Civil War, and a bank cashier.

== Biography ==
Doolittle was born in Burlington, Vermont, the son of Matthew Doolittle. He attended school in Montreal, Quebec, and moved to New York City in 1847, finally settling in Hillsdale, Michigan, where he was a store clerk.

He was commissioned first lieutenant in Company E, 4th Michigan Infantry on June 20, 1861, and promoted to captain of Company H on August 20, 1861. His regiment participated in the Peninsula Campaign, where he was wounded at the Battle of Gaines' Mill on June 28, 1862. He was promoted to colonel and assumed command of the 18th Michigan Infantry on August 13, 1862. Doolittle and his regiment served in the Western Theater for the duration of the war, with various assignments in Kentucky, Tennessee, Alabama, and Georgia. His troops helped defend Athens, Alabama, against Confederate cavalry under Joseph Wheeler and Decatur, Alabama, against John Bell Hood.

On April 22, 1865, President Andrew Johnson appointed Doolittle brigadier general of volunteers to rank from January 27, 1865. President Abraham Lincoln had nominated Doolittle for the appointment on January 30, 1865, and the U.S. Senate confirmed the nomination on February 14, 1865, but Lincoln was unable to make the formal appointment before he was assassinated. Doolittle was mustered out of the volunteer service on November 30, 1865. On February 24, 1866, President Johnson nominated Doolittle for appointment to the brevet grade of major general of volunteers, to rank from March 13, 1865, and the U.S. Senate confirmed the appointment on May 4, 1866.

After the war he was a cashier at Merchant's National Bank in Toledo, Ohio. He is buried in Toledo's Woodlawn Cemetery.

== See also ==
- List of American Civil War generals (Union)
