= Enzian Theater =

Nonprofit movie theater in Florida, US

Coordinates: 28.616335°N 81.365357°W

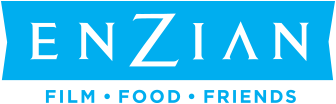
- Interactive map of Enzian Theater
- Address: Maitland, Florida; US

The Enzian Theater is a nonprofit arthouse movie theater located in Maitland, Florida. The theater hosts the Florida Film Festival and several other local film festivals. The name "Enzian" is the German word for gentian, a genus of mountain flower. Patrons sit in chairs around tables where drinks and meals are served during the film. The Enzian's motto is "Film Is Art".

== History ==
Founded by Tina Tiedtke in 1985, Enzian showed six to twelve classic films a week and occasional live shows. The theatre opened on February 15, 1985, with a showing of D.W. Griffith's Broken Blossoms and star Lillian Gish attended the event.

In 1989, Enzian refocused on first-run independent feature films.

== See also ==
- John Tiedtke
