= John Tiedtke =

Philanthropist, Farmer, Professor (b. 1907, d. 2004)

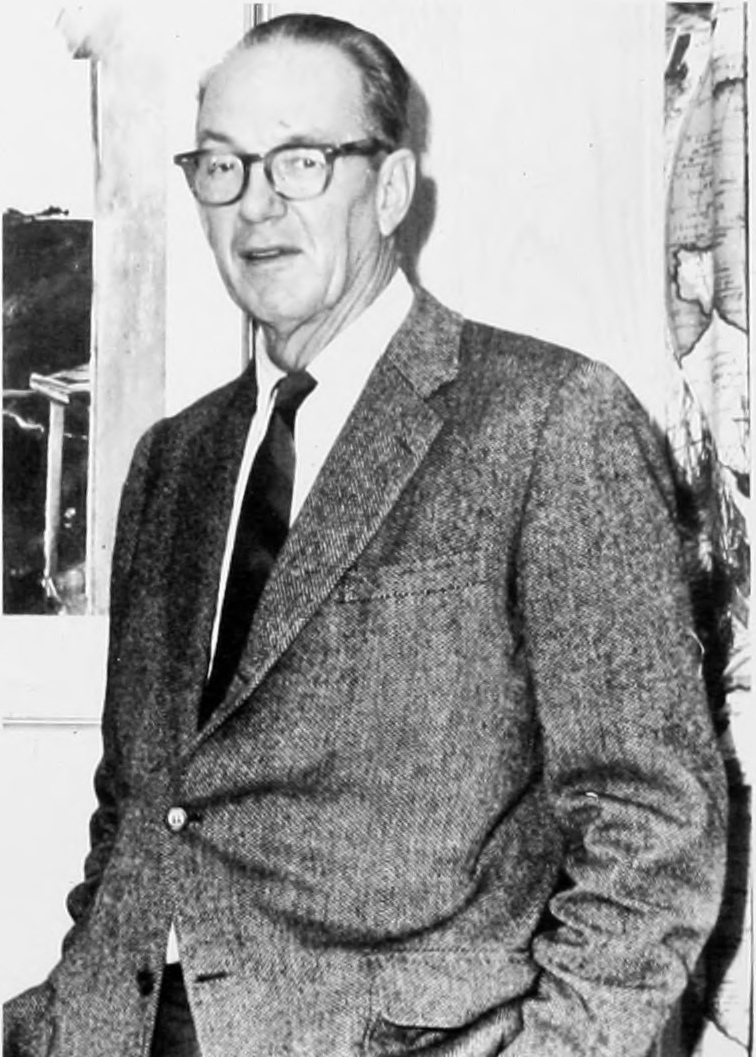
- Tiedtke c. 1967
- Born: September 15, 1907; Toledo, Ohio, US
- Died: December 22, 2004 (aged 97); Winter Park, Florida, US
- Burial place: Woodlawn Cemetery, Toledo, Ohio, U.S.
- Occupations: Philanthropist, Farmer, Professor, Entrepreneur
- Spouse: Sylvia Southard
- Children: 2

John Meyer Tiedtke (September 15, 1907 – December 22, 2004) was an American farmer, professor, college dean, businessman and philanthropist from Central Florida. He was the scion of a family that made its wealth in Toledo, Ohio, being the founders of the grocery and department store Tiedtke's. He was a benefactor to individuals and the community, even as he did it in a quiet and unassuming manner.

== Personal life ==
His parents were Ernest Tiedtke (1872–1950) and Anna Marie "Mamie" Meyer Tiedtke (1878–1981), of Toledo, Ohio. He was 7 years old when parents started spending time in Winter Park, Florida, in 1914. The state became his home as an adult.

In 1948, he was married to Sylvia Southard, daughter of Prince and Princess Alfred of Hohenlohe-Schillingsfürst (née Felicitas von Schoeller) of Streinach, Austria, and the late James Wendell Southard. Tiedtke died on December 22, 2004, at the age of 97 in Winter Park, Florida, less than a month after the death of his wife of 55 years.

He attended Culver Military Academy and Dartmouth College, where in 1930 he received a bachelor's degree, and in 1932 a master's degree from its Tuck School of Business.

== Career ==
Tiedtke's parents founded the Toledo, Ohio, grocery and department store Tiedtke's which they sold in 1925 at the height of its popularity and retired to Florida in the winters.

John's father, Ernest, had been a farmer before starting the grocery chain, and with the help of family money John went into the farming business too. In the 1930s he began buying land for sugar-cane farms, he found land was so cheap because of the Great Depression he could buy it for the cost of its unpaid property tax. He became a prominent and leading sugar, citrus and corn farmer, and cattleman, owning large spreads in Central Florida. After World War II, he did not enlist due to a bad knee, he was hired by Rollins College to teach returning soldiers business classes. He was director of the Palm Beach County Agricultural Advisory Committee. In October 1945, he testified before the Committee on Appropriations of the United States Congress about the availability of migrant labor on sugar plantations. He patented a cane loading and chopping machine.

Tiedtke was a philanthropist and patron of the arts. He is noted for championing and supporting various fine arts programs in Central Florida including the Bach Festival Society of Winter Park (Note: "Tiedtke's most notable contribution to the arts was his involvement in the Bach Festival. Since 1950 until his death, he served as the president of the Bach Festival and turned the program into the high quality performances that it is today.") and the Enzian Theater. He was instrumental in funding a unique film festival. In 1949, "Tiedtke breathed life into the Florida Symphony Orchestra" and was a founding member.

He was a full professor of economics beginning in 1951, becoming the school's first dean of graduate programs (1960 to 1965). He was its business manager, treasurer and second vice president. He became Vice President, Treasurer and Business Manager of the college. He devoted 20 years to being on the Board of Directors of Rollins College. He donated magnanimously to both the Rollins College Music and Theater Departments.

He was the owner of the Tiedtke well in Punta Gorda, Florida, which was the source of an unusual sample of Punta Gorda Anhydrite which he photographed.

== Legacy ==
Upon his death, the Orlando Sentinel wrote, "The arts in Central Florida lost a giant on Tuesday. He created wealth by investing in sugar, citrus and corn farms on land near Lake Okeechobee. Land companies, development companies, Shawnee Cattle and Atlas Sugar were among his holdings. But it was what he did with that wealth that has had so much impact. He spent millions bringing music, film, and art to his adopted home of Central Florida." Florida Today said Tiedtke "was another important figure in the cultural development of Winter Park" who "was very successful in the state's sugar industry". Orlando Magazine noted that Tiedtke was "a savior to nearly every arts organization in town, including the Bach Festival, Florida Symphony Orchestra, Orlando Museum of Art, Orlando Opera, and Festival of Orchestras—all that besides being a founder/funder of United Arts of Central Florida".

He individually funded the 400-seat John M. Tiedtke Concert Hall at Rollins. It is the music department's "flagship venue and features two Steinway D Concert grand pianos."

Tiedtke established the John M. Tiedtke Endowed Chair of Music — funded in part by an anonymous $250,000 donation from Fred Rogers, who was TV's Mister Rogers and alumni of Rollins. In 1972, he was one of eight Floridians to receive a "C.H.I.E.F." award ("Champions of Higher Independent Education in Florida") from the Independent Colleges and Universities of Florida. In 1973, Florida Governor Reubin Askew gave him one of the "Governor's Awards for the Arts".

The Tiedtke family's mausoleum is in Section 42 at Woodlawn Cemetery in Toledo, Ohio.

In 2019, in honor of the fifteenth anniversary of his passing, a memorial concert was dedicated to him at the Bach Festival Society, along with other memorial events in Winter Park.
