= Florida Film Festival =

Annual film festival held in Maitland, USA

Coordinates: 28.6163°N 81.3644°W

- Location: Maitland, Florida, U.S.
- Founded: 1991
- Website: floridafilmfestival.com

The Florida Film Festival, produced by Enzian Theater in Maitland, Florida, is an annual international film festival.

== Overview ==
The festival includes narrative and documentary features and shorts, animation, midnight movies, and educational forums, parties, and other events. The festival has also included highly experimental new media works.

== History ==
Past guests include Peter Falk, Susan Sarandon, Oliver Stone, Barry Levinson, Emma Stone, Paul Sorvino, Tippi Hedren, Cloris Leachman, Gabriel Byrne, Famke Janssen, Jason Lee, Christopher Walken, Dennis Hopper, Leelee Sobieski, Steve Buscemi, Campbell Scott, and William H. Macy.

== Oscar qualification ==
A win at the festival qualifies a film for Academy Award consideration.

== See also ==
- Film in Florida
- Florida Film Critics Circle
