= James Wendell Southard =

James Wendell Southard (July 16, 1895 – August 22, 1927) was an American businessman.

== Early life ==
Southard was born on July 16, 1895, in Toledo, Ohio. He was the son of James William Southard (1857–1926) and Laura (née Leighton) Southard (1867–1954), both of Ohio.

== Career ==
Southard served as president of the Old Masters Paper and Pulp Corporation. He was also associated with the Erie Steel Corporation of New York.

== Personal life ==
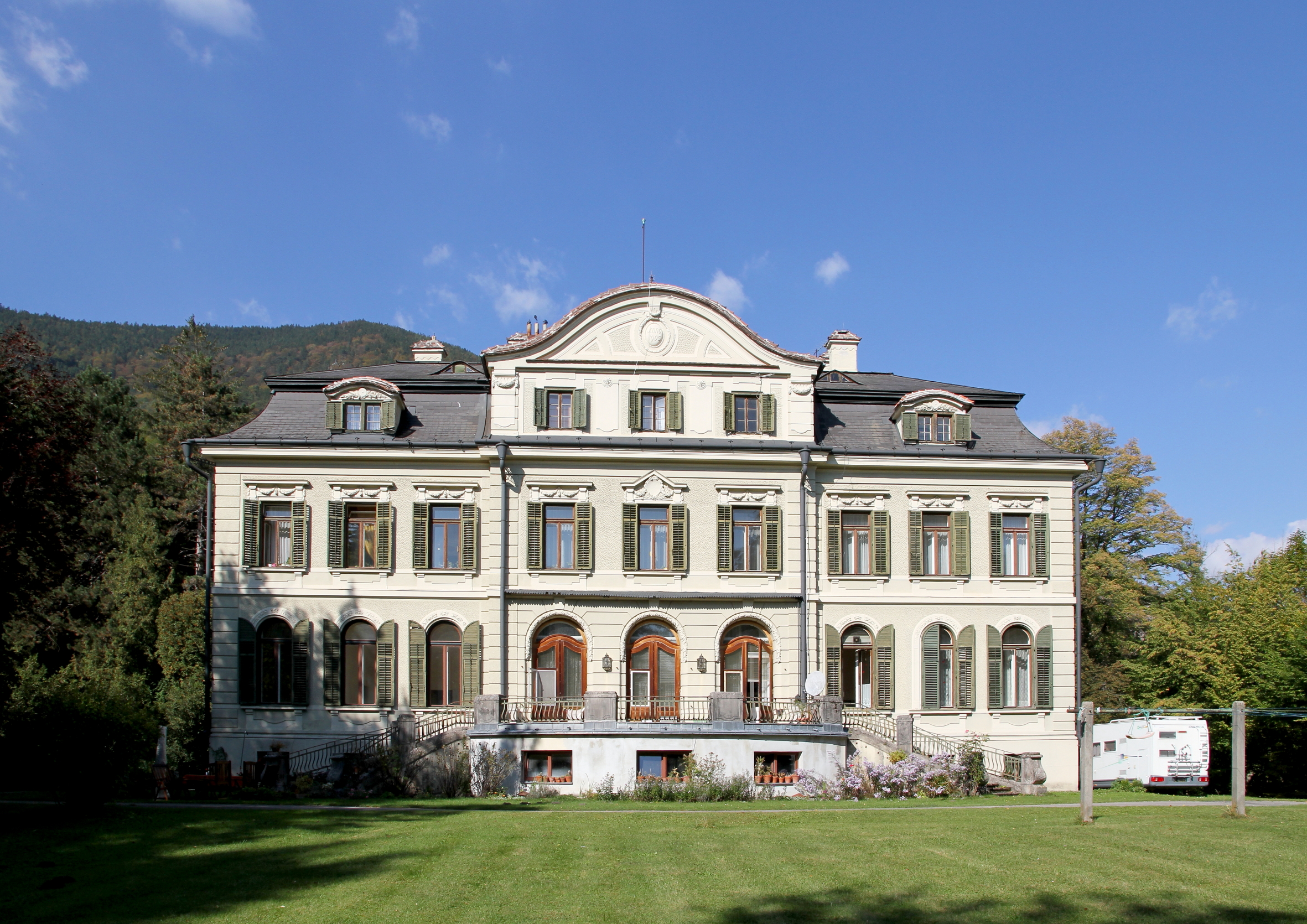
Villa Schoeller in Hirschwang

Southard married Felicitas Aletta Mechthild von Schoeller (1900–1975), a daughter of Austrian steel man, Ritter Richard von Schoeller and Emmi Frederika Siedenburg. Before his untimely death, they were the parents of:

- Sylvia Southard (1926–2004), who married John Meyer Tiedtke, a son of Ernest Tiedtke of the Ohio grocery and department store Tiedtke's.

Southard died on August 22, 1927, at Hirschwang, near Vienna, Austria. His body was returned to the United States and he was buried at Oak Grove Cemetery in Morenci, Michigan. After his death, his widow married Prince Alfred of Hohenlohe-Schillingsfürst on January 29, 1934 (a son of Prince Konrad of Hohenlohe-Schillingsfürst and Countess Franziska von Schönborn-Buchheim). Prince Alfred's youngest sister, Princess Franziska, was the wife of Archduke Maximilian of Austria (brother of Archduke Karl Franz of Austria, the last Emperor of Austria).
