= Frank C. Wachter =

American politician from Maryland

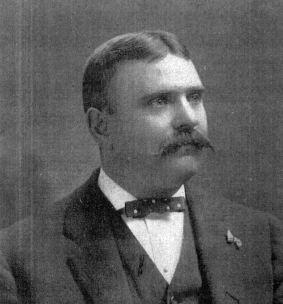

Member of the U.S. House of Representatives from Maryland's 3rd district
- In office March 4, 1899 – March 3, 1907
- Preceded by: William Samuel Booze
- Succeeded by: Harry Benjamin Wolf

Personal details
- Born: September 16, 1861 Baltimore, Maryland
- Died: July 1, 1910 (aged 48) Baltimore, Maryland
- Party: Republican

Frank Charles Wachter (September 16, 1861 – July 1, 1910) was an American politician and Congressman from Maryland.

== Biography ==
Born in Baltimore, Maryland to German immigrants, Wachter attended private schools and St. Paul's Evangelical School at Baltimore. He learned the trade of cloth cutting and in 1892 engaged in the cloth-shrinking business. He served as a member of the jail board of Baltimore from 1896 to 1898 and was an unsuccessful candidate for police commissioner of Baltimore in 1898.

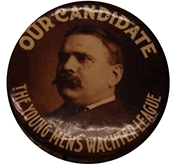
Campaign button depicting Wachter, year unknown

Wachter was elected as a Republican to the Fifty-sixth and to the three succeeding Congresses, serving from March 4, 1899, to March 3, 1907. He was not a candidate for renomination in 1906 and resumed his former business pursuits in Baltimore. He served as a member of the board of managers of Maryland Penitentiary from 1909 until his death in Baltimore. He is interred in Loudon Park Cemetery.

U.S. House of Representatives
Preceded by William Samuel Booze	Member of the U.S. House of Representatives from Maryland's 3rd congressional district 1899–1907	Succeeded by Harry Benjamin Wolf
