= Wanted! Jane Turner =

1936 American film directed by Edward Killy

- Directed by: Edward Killy; Ed Donahue (assistant)
- Screenplay by: John Twist; Edmund L. Hartmann
- Story by: John Twist
- Produced by: Lee Marcus; Cliff Reid
- Starring: Lee Tracy; Gloria Stuart
- Cinematography: Robert de Grasse
- Edited by: Ted Cheesman
- Music by: Roy Webb
- Production company: RKO Radio Pictures
- Release dates: November 27, 1936 (Premiere-New York City); December 4, 1936 (US)
- Running time: 67 minutes
- Country: United States
- Language: English

Wanted! Jane Turner is a 1936 American crime drama film directed by Edward Killy from a screenplay by Edmund L. Hartmann and John Twist, based on Twist's story. Produced by RKO Radio Pictures, the film premiered in New York City on November 27, 1936, with a national release the following week on December 4. The film stars Lee Tracy and Gloria Stuart with an extensive supporting cast.

== Plot ==
Two postal detectives track the gang that robbed a mail truck and killed the driver.

== Cast ==
- Lee Tracy as Tom Mallory
- Gloria Stuart as Doris Martin
- Ann Preston as Jane Turner (credited as Judith Blake)
- John McGuire as Jerry Turner
- Frank M. Thomas as Banks
- Paul Guilfoyle as Phil Crowley
- Irene Franklin as Ruby Winston
- Patricia Wilder as Babe
- Barbara Pepper as Marge Sanders, posing as Jane Turner
- Willard Robertson as Walter Davies
- Selmer Jackson as Ferris - Postal Inspector (uncredited)
- Thomas E. Jackson as Lansing - Postal Chief (uncredited)
- Lew Kelly as Mike - Plainclothesman (uncredited)
- Lee Kohlmar as John Taylor (uncredited)
- George Lloyd as Henchman Dutch Emory (uncredited)
- Arthur Loft as Henchman Glen (uncredited)
- Aileen Pringle as Norris' Secretary (uncredited)
- Bryant Washburn as Magee (uncredited)
- Pierre Watkin as Andrew Norris (uncredited)
- Paul Fix as Crowley's Henchman
