= Princess Franziska of Hohenlohe-Waldenburg-Schillingsfürst =

Austrian archduchess (1897–1989)

- Archduchess Maximilian Eugen of Austria
- Princess Franziska c. 1917
- Born: 21 June 1897; Teplice, Kingdom of Bohemia, Austria-Hungary
- Died: 12 July 1989 (aged 92); Salzburg, Austria
- Burial: Anif, near Salzburg
- Spouse: Archduke Maximilian Eugen of Austria (m. 1917; died 1952)
- Issue: Archduke Ferdinand; Archduke Heinrich
Names
- Franziska Maria Anna
- House: Hohenlohe-Waldenburg-Schillingsfürst
- Father: Prince Konrad of Hohenlohe-Schillingsfürst
- Mother: Countess Franziska of Schönborn-Buchheim

Princess Franziska of Hohenlohe-Waldenburg-Schillingsfürst (21 June 1897 – 12 July 1989) was a member of Hohenlohe-Waldenburg-Schillingsfürst by birth and was a member of House of Habsburg-Lorraine through her marriage to Archduke Maximilian, the only brother of Emperor Charles I.

== Early life ==
Princess Franziska was born in Teplice, Bohemia, into the princely House of Hohenlohe. She was the daughter of Prince Konrad of Hohenlohe-Schillingsfürst, who later served as Prime Minister of Austria, and Countess Franziska of Schönborn-Buchheim. Within her family circle, she was affectionately known by the lifelong nickname "Fanny".

== Marriage and issue ==
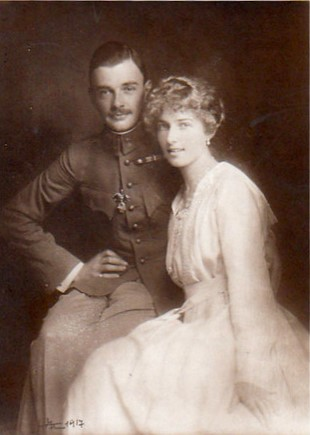
Franziska with her husband Maximilian, 1917.

On 29 November 1917, Princess Franziska married Archduke Maximilian Eugen at Schloss Laxenburg, near Vienna.

The marriage produced two sons:

- Archduke Ferdinand (1918–2004), who married Countess Helene of Törring-Jettenbach in 1950. Ferdinand and Helene are the parents of Sophie Habsburg.
- Archduke Heinrich (1925–2014), who married Countess Ludmilla von Galen in 1961.

Following the fall of the Habsburg monarchy in late 1918, the family relocated to Bavaria, Germany, where they adopted the civilian titles of Count and Countess von Wernberg to lead a private life. Following her death in 1989, she was buried alongside her husband in the cemetery at Anif, near Salzburg.

== Ancestry ==
Ancestors of Princess Franziska of Hohenlohe-Waldenburg-Schillingsfürst

8. Franz Joseph, Prince of Hohenlohe-Schillingsfürst
4. Prince Konstantin of Hohenlohe-Schillingsfürst
9. Princess Constanze of Hohenlohe-Langenburg
2. Prince Konrad of Hohenlohe-Schillingsfürst
10. Ludwig, Prince of Sayn-Wittgenstein-Berleburg
5. Princess Marie of Sayn-Wittgenstein-Berleburg
11. Princess Caroline Leonilla Radziwiłł
1. Princess Franziska of Hohenlohe-Waldenburg-Schillingsfürst
12. Count Karl of Schönborn-Buchheim
6. Count Erwein of Schönborn-Buchheim
13. Countess Anna de Bolza
3. Countess Franziska of Schönborn-Buchheim
14. Ferdinand, 3rd Prince von Trauttmansdorff-Weinsberg
7. Countess Franziska von Trauttmansdorff-Weinsberg
15. Princess Anna von Liechtenstein

== Bibliography ==
- McNaughton, Arnold (1973). The Book of Kings: A Royal Genealogy. Quadrangle/New York Times Book Company. ISBN 978-0812902808.
- Gothaisches genealogisches Taschenbuch der fürstlichen Häuser. Gotha: Justus Perthes. 1910.
