= 18th Michigan Infantry Regiment =

18th Michigan Volunteer Infantry Regiment
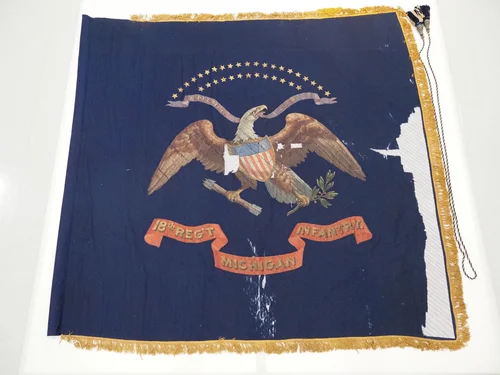
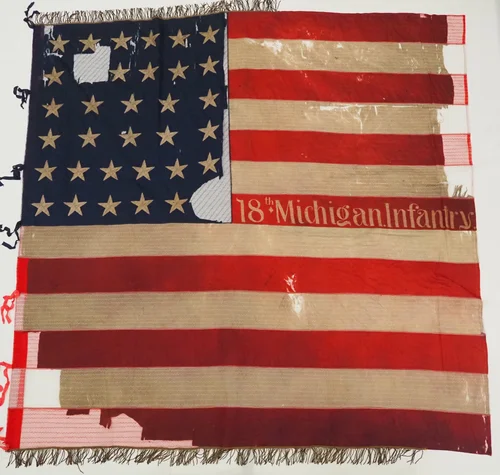
- Standards of the 18th Michigan Volunteer Infantry Regiment
- Active: August 26, 1862, to July 4, 1865
- Country: United States
- Allegiance: Union
- Branch: Infantry
- Size: 1,002 (11 companies)
- Engagements: American Civil War: Defense of Cincinnati; Battle of Decatur

Commanders
- Colonel: Colonel Charles Doolittle
- Lieutenant Colonel: Lieutenant Colonel George Spalding
- Major: Major John W. Horner

The 18th Michigan Infantry Regiment was an infantry regiment that served in the Union Army during the American Civil War.

== Service ==
The 18th Michigan Infantry was mustered into federal service at Hillsdale, Michigan, by Henry Waldron per the request of Governor Austin Blair, on August 26, 1862. It would camp on Lewis Emery's farm in Hillsdale. The regiment left Hillsdale on September 4th to participate in the Defense of Cincinnati. The 18th was then assigned to the Army of Kentucky and would move to Lexington in October to prevent Confederate forces from plundering towns and villages, until it marched to Danville between February 21-22, 1863. The 18th then retreated to the Kentucky River between the 24th-27th. After the retaking of Lexington, the 18th would return for garrison until March 21. The 18th skirmished against John Pegram's forces frequently, until it was moved to Lebanon on April 3, and then to Nashville, Tennessee on the 7th, arriving on the 14th for garrison duty until June 11, 1864. It was transferred to Decatur, Alabama for garrison duty until September 1. During this period the 18th would see actual fighting against Joseph Wheeler's forces in Northern Alabama, notably near Athens where a detachment of skirmishers from the 18th was captured on September 23. The 18th fought at the battle of Decatur, Alabama between October 26-29 against John Bell Hood's forces. The 18th would then garrison along the Memphis and Charleston Railroad until January 11, 1865, and moved to Huntsville the same day on post duty until June 20. The 18th was then moved to Nashville and was mustered out of service on June 26, 1865.

== Total strength and casualties ==
The regiment suffered 18 enlisted men who were killed in action or mortally wounded and 293 enlisted men who died of disease, for a total of 311 fatalities.

== See also ==
- List of Michigan Civil War Units
- Michigan in the American Civil War
