= Myles Thomas =

American baseball player (1897–1963)

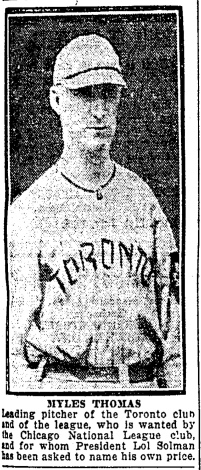
- Pitcher
- Born: October 22, 1897; State College, Pennsylvania, U.S.
- Died: December 12, 1963 (aged 66); Toledo, Ohio, U.S.
- Batted: Right Threw: Right

MLB debut
- April 18, 1926, for the New York Yankees

Last MLB appearance
- June 21, 1930, for the Washington Senators

MLB statistics
- Win–loss record: 23–22
- Earned run average: 4.64
- Strikeouts: 121
- Stats at Baseball Reference

Teams
- New York Yankees (1926–1929); Washington Senators (1929–1930)

Career highlights and awards
- 2× World Series champion (1927, 1928)

Myles Lewis Thomas (October 22, 1897 – December 12, 1963) was an American right-handed pitcher in Major League Baseball. He was born in State College, Pennsylvania. He threw and batted right-handed, and he was also 5 ft 9.5 in (1.77 m) tall and 170 pounds. He was nicknamed "Duck Eye" by Babe Ruth.

On April 18, 1926, at the age of 28, he made his major league debut with the New York Yankees. On June 15, 1929, he was purchased from the Yankees by the Washington Senators. Overall, he went 23–22 with a 4.64 career ERA. As a batter, he hit a respectable (for a pitcher) .240. He had a career .955 fielding percentage. In the postseason, he had a 3.00 ERA in 2 games.

Thomas played his final game on June 21, 1930. He died in Toledo, Ohio due to a heart attack at age 66. His body is buried in Woodlawn Cemetery in Toledo.

== 1927: The Diary of Myles Thomas ==
In 2016, ESPN announced 1927: The Diary of Myles Thomas, part a new genre of storytelling known as "real-time historical fiction." The core of the project is a historical novel in the form of a diary of Myles Thomas, written by Douglas Alden, complemented by a wealth of fact-based content from the season, all published along the same timeline as the events unfolded almost 90 years ago. Through Myles Thomas's diary entries, additional essays and real-time social-media components “re-living” that famous Yankees season, the goal is to explore the rarefied nexus of baseball, jazz and Prohibition — defining elements of the remarkable world that existed in 1927. The diary runs the length of the full 1927 season, from April 13 through October 10, 1927.
