= William S. Booze =

American politician (1862-1933)

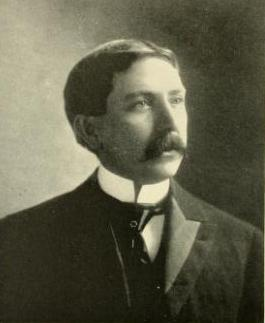
- Booze in an 1899 publication

Member of the U.S. House of Representatives from Maryland's 3rd district
- In office March 4, 1897 – March 3, 1899
- Preceded by: Harry Welles Rusk
- Succeeded by: Frank Charles Wachter

Personal details
- Born: William Samuel Booze; January 9, 1862 Baltimore, Maryland, U.S.
- Died: December 6, 1933 (aged 71) Wilmington, Delaware, U.S.
- Resting place: Loudon Park Cemetery; Baltimore, Maryland, U.S.
- Party: Republican
- Children: 2
- Education: Baltimore City College; University of Maryland School of Medicine; College of Physicians and Surgeons (MD)
- Occupation: Politician; medical doctor; businessman

William Samuel Booze (January 9, 1862 – December 6, 1933) was an American politician and medical doctor from Maryland. He served as U.S. Representative from the third district of Maryland from 1897 to 1899. He practiced medicine in South Baltimore. In later life, he engaged in banking and brokerage businesses.

== Early life ==
William Samuel Booze was born on January 9, 1862, in Baltimore, Maryland. He attended the public schools in Baltimore and graduated from Baltimore City College in 1879. Afterwards attended the University of Maryland School of Medicine and graduated with a Doctor of Medicine from the College of Physicians and Surgeons, New York City, in 1882.

== Career ==
Following graduation, Booze practiced medicine in South Baltimore on South Sharp Street until 1896. He was a partner of the firm A. F. Booze & Co, which operated steam sawmills and coal and wood yards.

Booze was elected to Congress, Booze ran as a for the United States Congress in 1894, but lost to Harry Welles Rusk. He unsuccessfully contested the election. With an initial majority of 518 votes in favor of Rusk, the election committee found 332 votes were in error: 131 additional votes were found for Booze upon recount, 40 legal voters had been refused their vote for Booze because others voted under their names, and 161 illegal or fraudulent votes had been cast for Rusk. This reduced Rusk's majority to 186 votes. In 1896, he ran again for Congress and on the campaign trail, his opponent Thomas C. Weeks challenged Booze to a debate. Booze didn't accept the challenge and during his speeches, Weeks would remark "Where is Booze?" in reaction to his debate refusal. Booze was subsequently elected to the Fifty-fifth Congress (March 4, 1897 - March 3, 1899). After this term, Booze was not a candidate for renomination in 1898. He was selected as a delegate to the Republican National Conventions in 1904 and 1908. He was president of the League of Republican Clubs of Maryland from 1894 to 1898. He also served as president of the Young Men's Republican Club in 1911.

Booze engaged in banking and in the brokerage business in Baltimore until 1908 or 1915, sources differ. The firm Booze, Mason & Co., which Booze was associated dissolved in 1903 and Booze continued the business. The William S. Booze Company, a stock brokerage business was incorporated in December 1906. The company dissolved in 1908. He later engaged in the practice of medicine.

== Personal life ==
Booze had a daughter and son, Mrs. J. Lundie Smith and Don. In 1894, he lived on South Sharp Street in Baltimore. He later lived at the Langham in Baltimore.

Booze had a heart attack and then died on December 6, 1933, at the Homeopathic Hospital in Wilmington, Delaware, while en route to his home from a trip to South America. He is interred in Loudon Park Cemetery, Baltimore.

U.S. House of Representatives
Preceded by Harry Welles Rusk	Member of the U.S. House of Representatives from Maryland's 3rd congressional district 1897–1899	Succeeded by Frank Charles Wachter
