= Imagination Station =

Science museum in Toledo, Ohio, U.S.

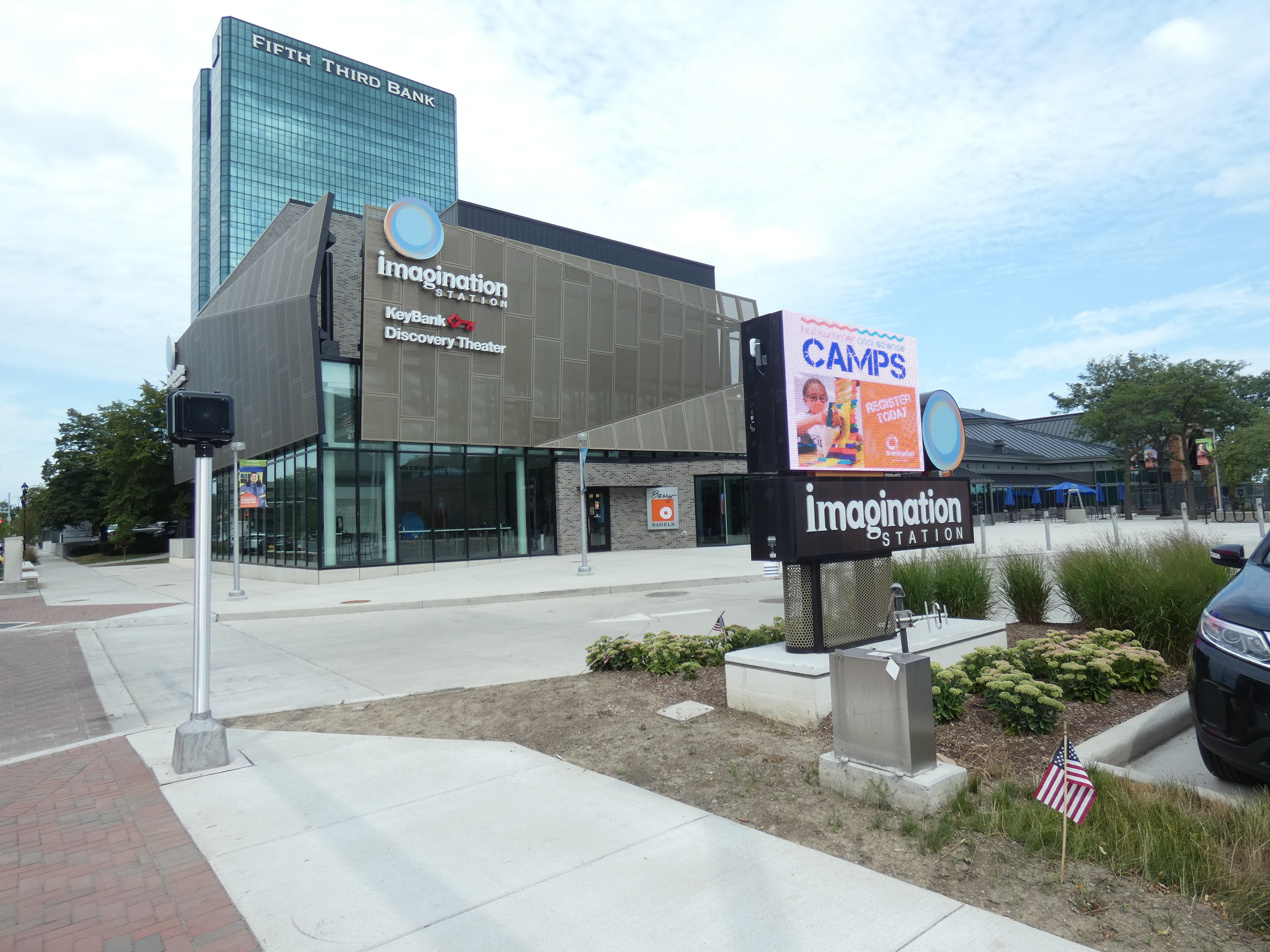
- Museum's main entrance with renovated exterior
- Former name: Center of Science and Industry (COSI), Toledo Science Center
- Established: March 1, 1997 (as COSI) October 10, 2009
- Dissolved: December 31, 2007 (as COSI)
- Location: Toledo, Ohio, United States
- Coordinates: 41°39′07″N 83°31′53″W
- Type: Science museum
- Website: imaginationstationtoledo.org

Imagination Station (formerly the Center of Science and Industry or COSI) is a non-profit, hands-on science museum located adjacent to the Maumee River in Downtown Toledo, Ohio. It has more than 300 exhibits for "children of all ages".

The museum opened in 1997 as COSI. It occupied the former Portside Marketplace, a festival marketplace-style shopping and restaurant complex developed by The Rouse Company and Enterprise Development Company (EDC) that operated from 1984–1990.

After tax levies failed in 2006 and 2007, COSI closed its doors to the public on the last day of 2007 due to lack of funding. In 2008, voters approved an operating levy to reopen the facility as The Toledo Science Center. This interim name was replaced by "Imagination Station", which opened on October 10, 2009.

== History ==
=== Portside Festival Marketplace ===
Portside was a festival marketplace in Toledo, Ohio, which failed and closed after just six years of operation. It was developed by the Enterprise Development Company (EDC), a for-profit subsidiary of the Enterprise Foundation, founded by James W. Rouse in 1982 after he retired from The Rouse Company as CEO in 1979. However, The Rouse Company was still involved with development as the marketplace began plans in the late 1970s. The EDC was founded to bring Rouse's festival marketplace concept to smaller cities, which included Toledo.

Portside Festival Marketplace
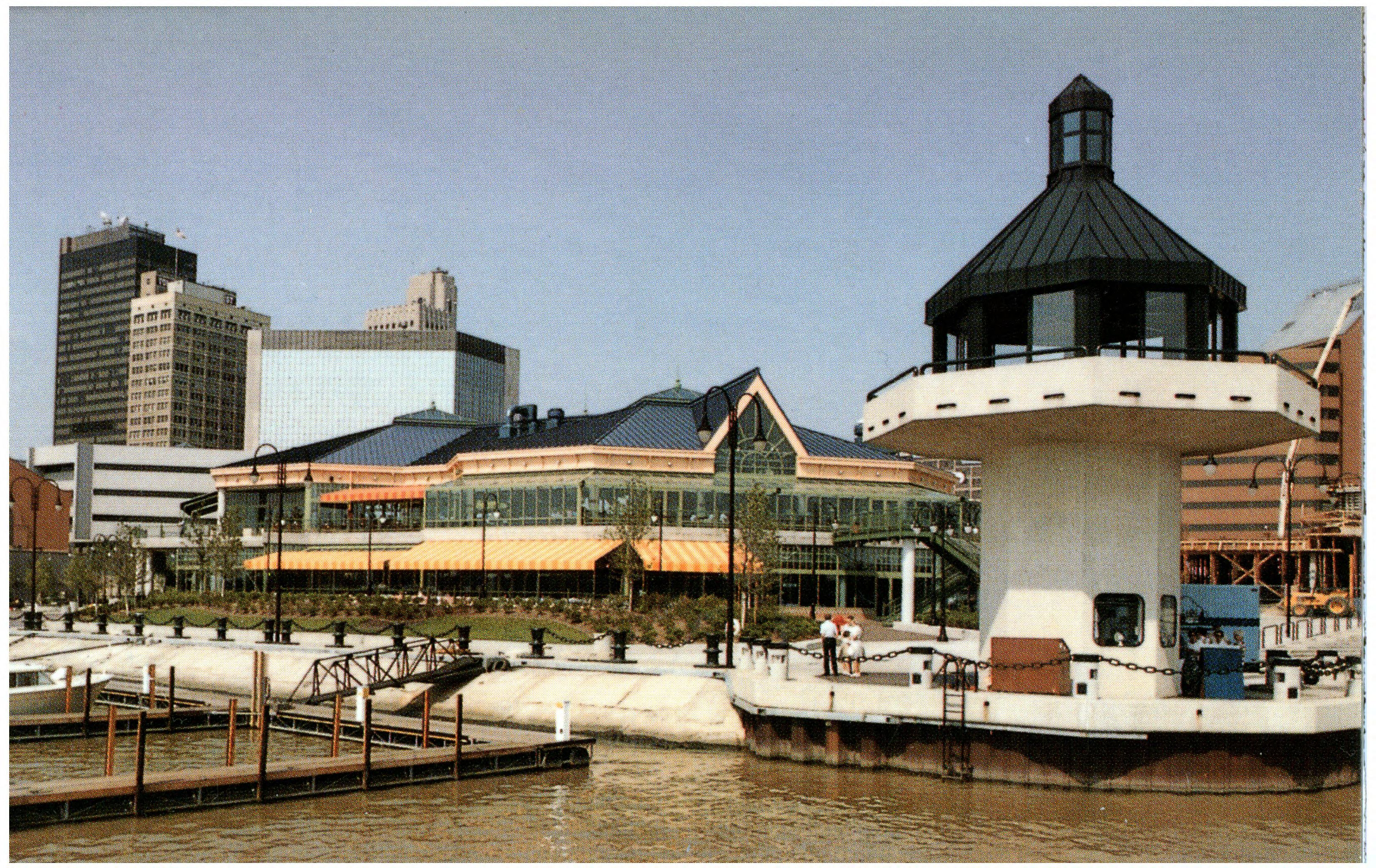
- Waterfront view, c. mid-1980s
- Location: Toledo, Ohio, U.S.
- Address: 408 N. Summit Street, 43604
- Opened: May 19, 1984; 42 years ago
- Closed: September 1990; 36 years ago (redeveloped as Imagination Station)
- Developer: The Rouse Company and the Enterprise Development Co.
- Manager: Toledo Economic Planning Council Development Corp.
- Owner: Toledo Economic Planning Council Development Corp. (Portside); City of Toledo (land)
- Architect: Mort Hoppenfeld's The Collaborative
- Floors: 2
- Building details

General information
- Status: Defunct; now operating as a science museum
- Construction started: 1982
- Completed: 1984

==== Background ====
From the 1950s through the 1970s, many retailers closed or left Downtown Toledo for the suburbs. The grocery and department store Tiedtke's, once called "America's first supermarket," closed on September 2, 1973. On May 7, 1975, a fire destroyed the store's former location at 408 Summit Street, the riverfront land on which Portside would be built. By 1984, all of Toledo's four main local department store retailers had left downtown or closed.

==== Late 1970s–1984: Development and opening ====
In the late 1970s, in an effort to promote urban renewal, Toledo mayor Douglas DeGood worked with leaders from Owens-Illinois and Toledo Trust, a Toledo-based regional bank, to develop new headquarters for both companies on the Maumee riverfront.

Toledo Trust financed the development of the Portside complex, aiming to catalyze Downtown Toledo's rebirth. The Rouse Company of Columbia, Maryland, which also developed Harborplace in Baltimore and Faneuil Hall Marketplace in Boston, Massachusetts, was selected as the developer of the project, but due to James Rouse's retirement from the company in 1979, he spearheaded construction to the newly-founded Enterprise Development Company, which in turn broke ground of the marketplace in 1982. The Portside Festival Marketplace costed $14 million. Prior to construction, James Rouse was hesitant on developing the project; its success would depend on the economic status of Toledo. He explicitly warned local leaders "No, you're not ready."

==== 1984–1990: Decline and closure ====
Portside had its grand opening celebration on May 19, 1984, attracting 4.5 million visitors. However, that success quickly faded away. The marketplace failed to draw predicted visitors and revenues; its collapse contributed to the downfall of Toledo Trust and left several small business owners in ruin, and when the novelty wore off, the mall was only attracting half of the original 4.5 million visitors it attracted in its first year.

Trustcorp (formerly Toledo Trust) even dismissed the EDC as manager in 1988. In 1990, Portside was deemed unprofitable, and the City of Toledo announced that the mall would cease operations in September of that year for a $5 to $7 million redevelopment, involving converting the facility into a regional entertainment center that would be expected to open in March 1991. Portside was described as a dead mall in May 1990, with papered up windows and locked doors.

The marketplace officially closed its doors in September 1990 after just six years of operation. The Buffalo News stated that Portside "may be the best example of what not to do with waterfront shopping centers" in May 1989.

=== Redevelopment as COSI ===
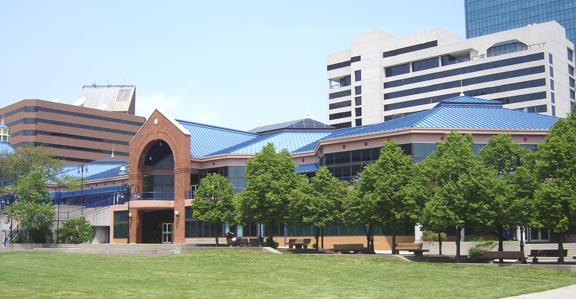
Waterfront view (May 2007)

A mayoral committee appointed to find the best adaptive reuse for the site heard repeated community requests for an educational family attraction. The city asked COSI Columbus about its experience and resources, and subsequently the city and the Columbus organization created COSI Toledo, an independent, not-for-profit organization with a board of trustees from northwest Ohio.

A fundraising campaign raised $9.5 million, surpassing the goal by $4.5 million. The state government gave another $10 million. The former Portside Festival Marketplace facility was transferred to COSI at a value of $16 million, which opened its doors to the public on March 1, 1997. The facility attracted an average of 250,000 visitors per year over its first decade.

In 2005, COSI won a National Award for Museum and Library Service from the Institute of Museum and Library Services, the nation's highest honor for extraordinary public service by a museum or library. The award was presented by Laura Bush at a White House ceremony in January 2006.

=== Rebranding as Imagination Station ===
On July 28, 2006, COSI Toledo and COSI Columbus legally split so each could focus on their own financial troubles. Later that year, Berrien Springs Public Schools awarded a 2006 Teachers' Choice Awards to COSI for its distance learning program. After voters voted down a second levy in November 2007, COSI Toledo closed due to lack of funding on December 31, 2007.

On November 4, 2008, Lucas County, Ohio, voters approved an operating levy for the science center, enabling it to reopen in fall 2009. In 2019, the Imagination Station launched a $10 million upgrade, including an 8,200-square-foot (760 m^{2}) theater with a 4K, 3D-capable screen and seats for people. KeyBank paid $2 million for the naming rights, and therefore, it would open as the KeyBank Discovery Theater. The new attraction required the building to be partially demolished, with the removal of the pedestrian bridge. The center would remain open during the construction, projected to be complete in June 2020.

== Gallery ==
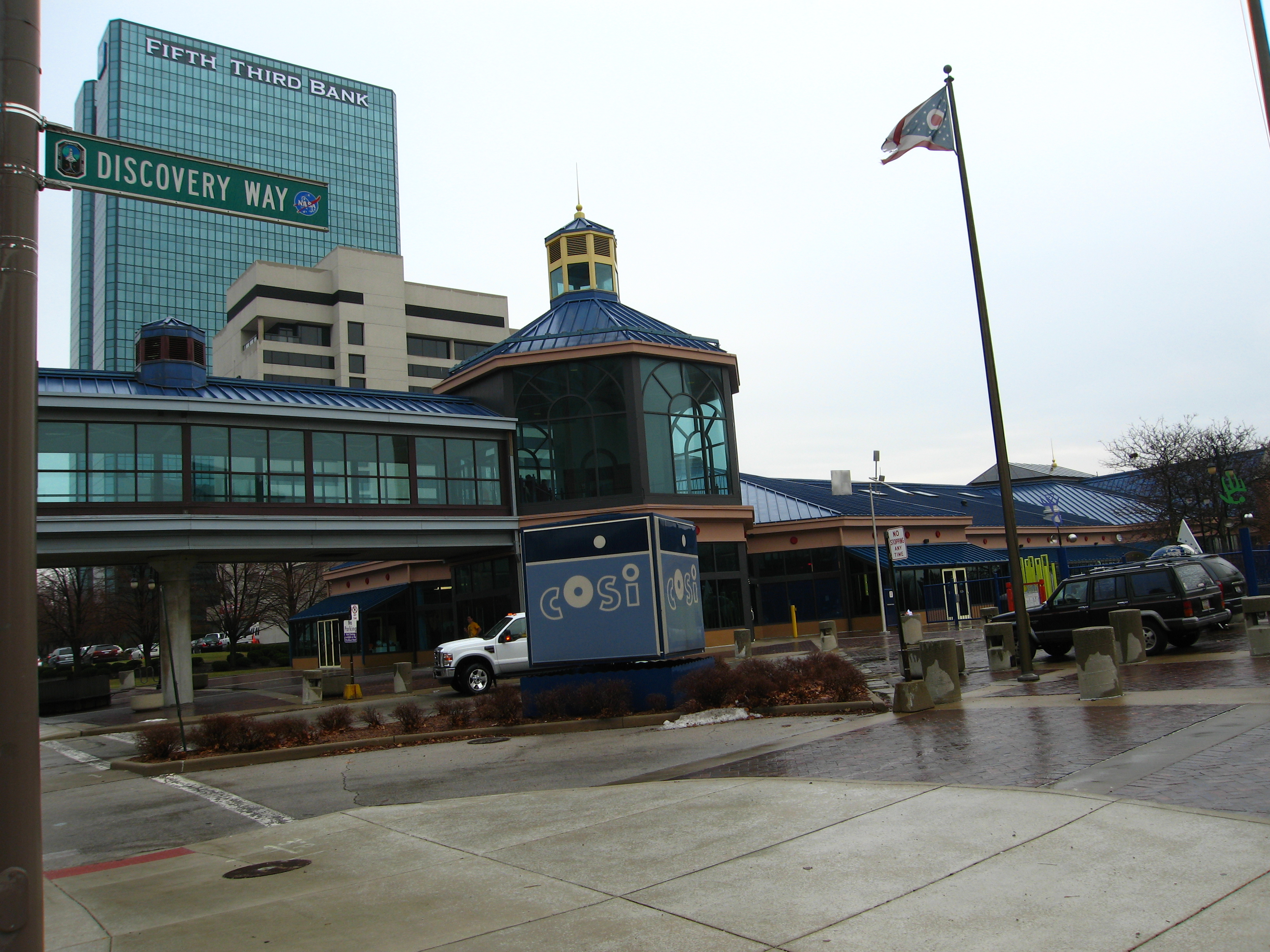
COSI Toledo main entrance in December 2007 (now Imagination Station), with Fifth Third Center at One SeaGate in the distance.

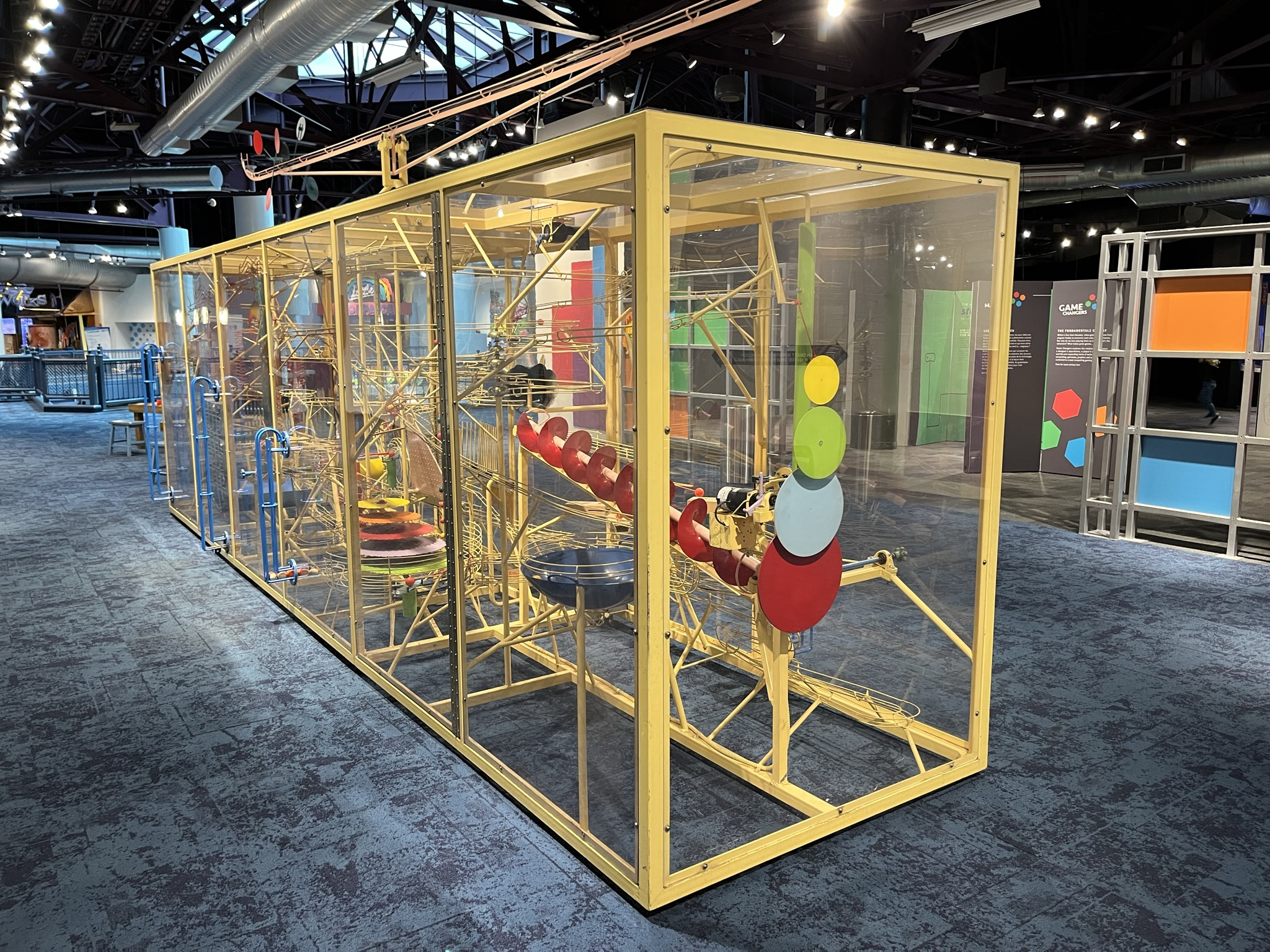
A Rube Goldbergian–style machine in the main lobby that creates music via user-dropped billiard balls in Imagination Station. (April 2022)

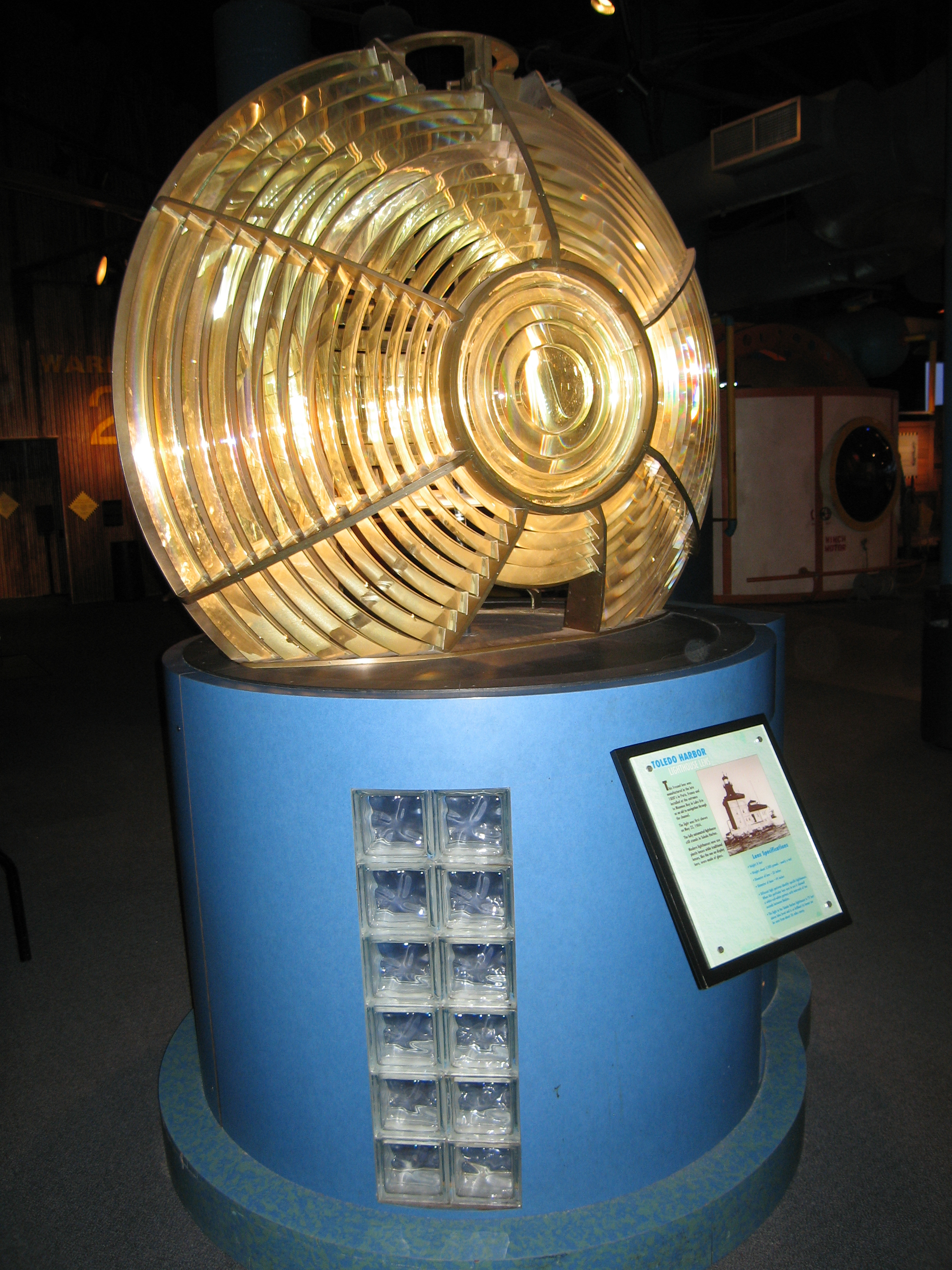
The Toledo Harbor Lighthouse's original Fresnel lens on display in COSI Toledo. (December 2007)
