= Prince Konrad of Hohenlohe-Schillingsfürst =

Austrian aristocrat and statesman

Durchlaucht Konrad zu Hohenlohe-Schillingsfürst
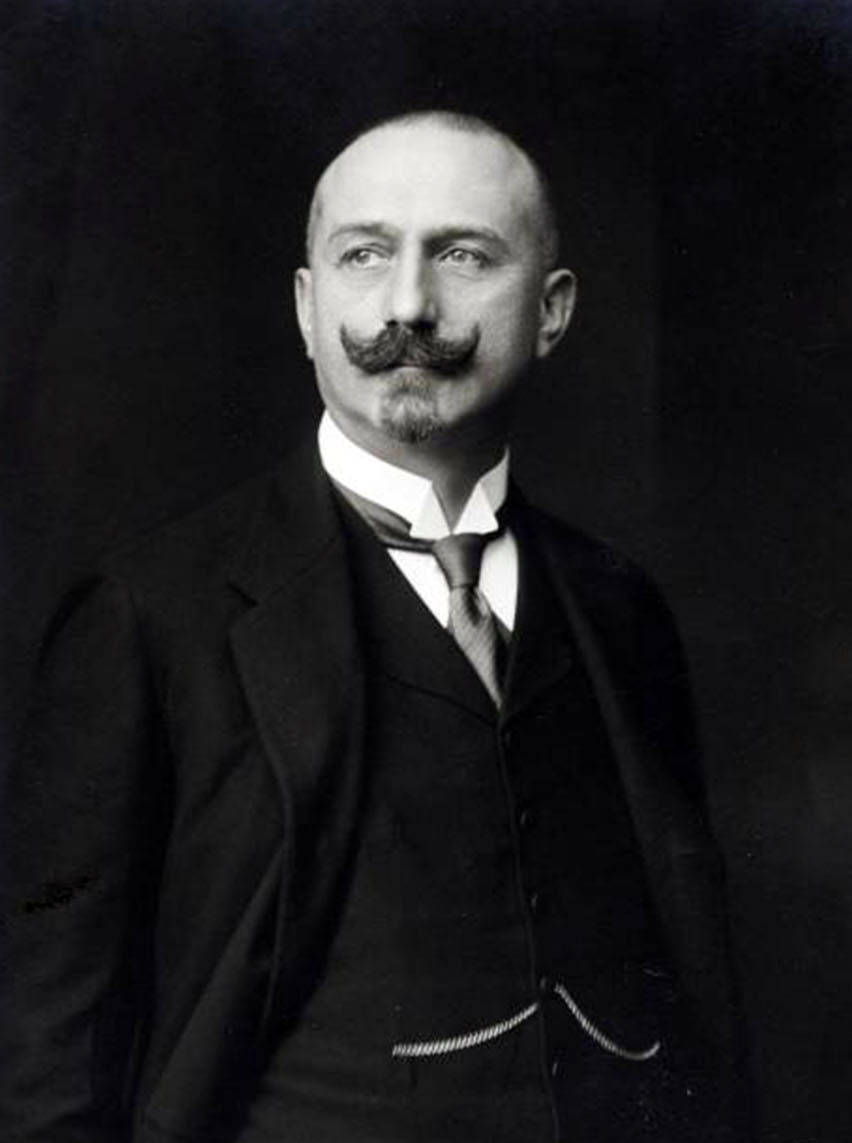
- Prince Konrad zu Hohenlohe in 1915

Minister-President of Austria
- In office 2 May 1906 – 2 June 1906
- Monarch: Francis Joseph I
- Preceded by: Paul Gautsch von Frankenthurn
- Succeeded by: Max Wladimir von Beck

Personal details
- Born: 16 December 1863 Vienna, Austrian Empire
- Died: 21 December 1918 (aged 55) Kammern im Liesingtal, Styria
- Spouse: Countess Franziska of Schönborn-Buchheim (m. 1888)
- Children: 6, including Alfred and Franziska
- Parent(s): Prince Konstantin of Hohenlohe-Waldenburg-Schillingsfürst; Princess Marie of Sayn-Wittgenstein-Berleburg

Konrad Maria Eusebius Prinz zu Hohenlohe-Waldenburg-Schillingsfürst (16 December 1863 – 21 December 1918) was an Austrian aristocrat and statesman. He briefly served as Prime Minister of Austria (Cisleithania) in Austria-Hungary in 1906.

== Early life ==
Prince Konrad was born in Vienna, the son of Prince Konstantin of Hohenlohe-Waldenburg-Schillingsfürst (1828–1896), k.u.k. Chief Intendant and General of the cavalry, and his wife Marie née Princess of Sayn-Wittgenstein-Berleburg (1837–1920), a daughter of Carolyne zu Sayn-Wittgenstein, known for her liaison with Franz Liszt. By his father, Konrad was a nephew of Viktor I, Duke of Ratibor, of Chlodwig, Prince of Hohenlohe-Schillingsfürst (Chancellor of Germany 1894–1900), and of Gustav Adolf, Cardinal Prince of Hohenlohe-Schillingsfürst.

Prince Konrad attended the Schottengymnasium and went on to study law at the University of Vienna from 1883 to 1887. He entered the Cisleithanian civil service in Prague and later worked at the k.k. Ministry of the Interior. Appointed district officer (Bezirkshauptmann) in Teplitz-Schönau, Bohemia, he proved to be a man of conciliation and social justice, when he achieved settlement of a miners' strike and granted permission for performance of Gerhart Hauptmann's socially critical play The Weavers, which earned him the nickname "Red Prince".

== Career ==
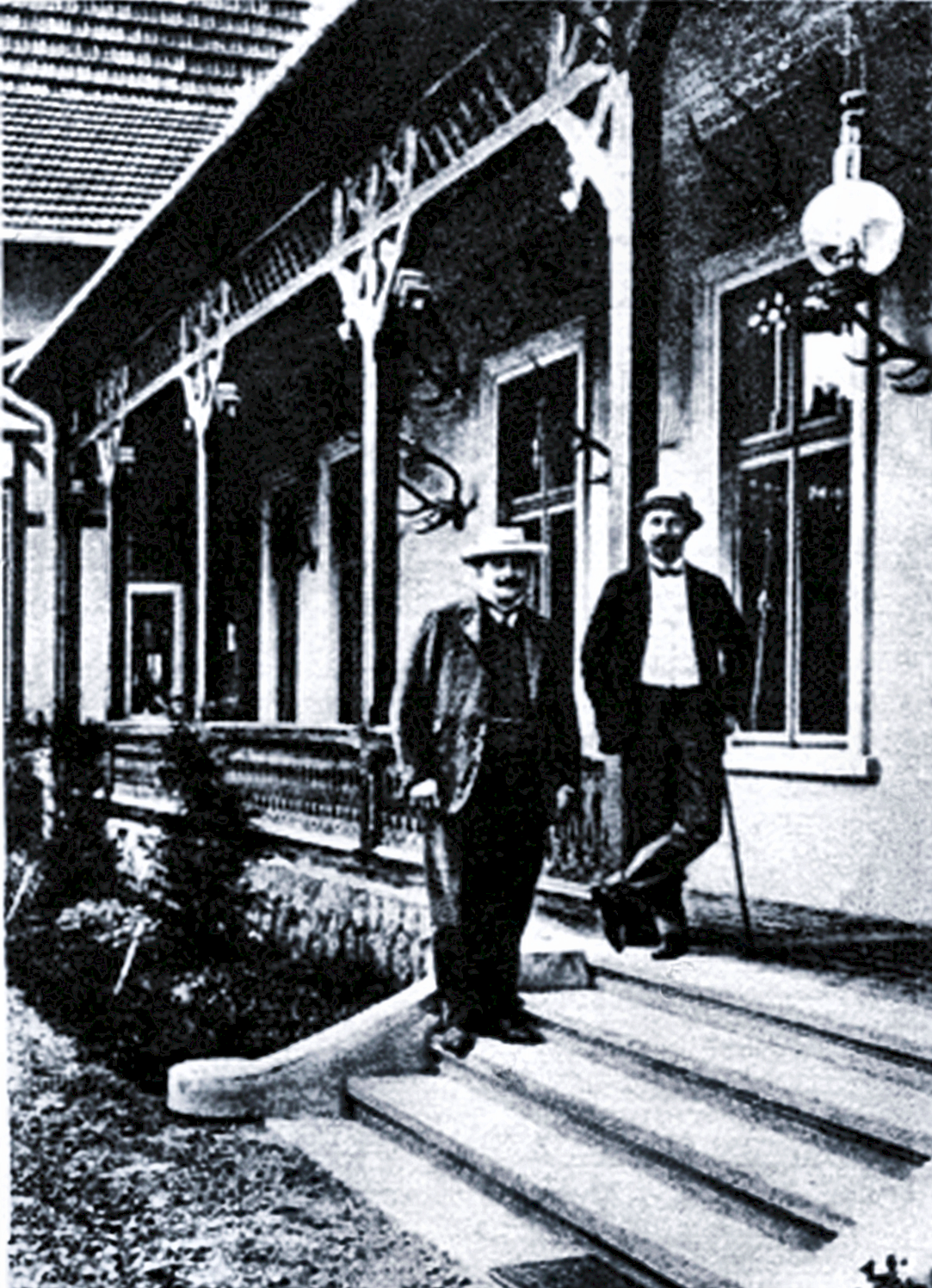
Prince Hohenlohe with Georg Wassilko von Serecki in Berehomet, about 1903/04

In 1903/04, Prince Konrad served as k.k. Stadtholder (Steward) of the Bukovina in Czernowitz, and from 1904 as Stadtholder of the Austrian Littoral in Trieste. A confidant of the heir to the throne, Archduke Franz Ferdinand, he was appointed Minister-President of Cisleithania on 2 May 1906, in order to push through an electoral reform establishing universal male suffrage in elections to the Imperial Council, where his predecessor Paul Gautsch von Frankenthurn had failed. Prince Konrad tried to mobilize the votes of the Italian representatives in the Council against a "Slavic" block, but did not succeed in achieving a majority. He resigned within one month and returned to Trieste. It was left to his successor Max Wladimir von Beck to get the new electoral law passed.

Prince Konrad remained Stadtholder of the Littoral until 1915. He had to cope with rising Italian irredentism and his measures of centralization in favour of the Vienna government met with strong protest. When the Kingdom of Italy threatened to join the Entente Powers, he resigned and temporarily joined the Imperial-Royal Landwehr forces on the Eastern Front. Back in Vienna he assumed the office of k.k. Minister of the Interior on 30 November 1915 in the cabinet of Minister-President Count Karl von Stürgkh. As minister, he evolved plans of re-arranging the Austro-Hungarian dual monarchy into a federation of four major states: Austria proper, Hungary, Poland (Galicia), and "Illyria" (i.e. Croatia-Slavonia, Bosnia and Herzegovina, and Dalmatia). However, those plans were rejected mainly by Hungarian politicians.

Prince Konrad resigned as Interior Minister on 31 October 1916, shortly after Minister-President Stürgkh was assassinated by Friedrich Adler. From 2 December 1916 he served for three weeks as joint finance minister of Austria-Hungary, before he was succeeded by Stephan Burián von Rajecz on 22 December. Also from 2 December he was a member of the Austrian House of Lords until its dissolution in November 1918. In 1917 emperor Charles I made him Obersthofmeister (Grand Master of the Court). With the end of World War I he retired from politics.

== Personal life ==
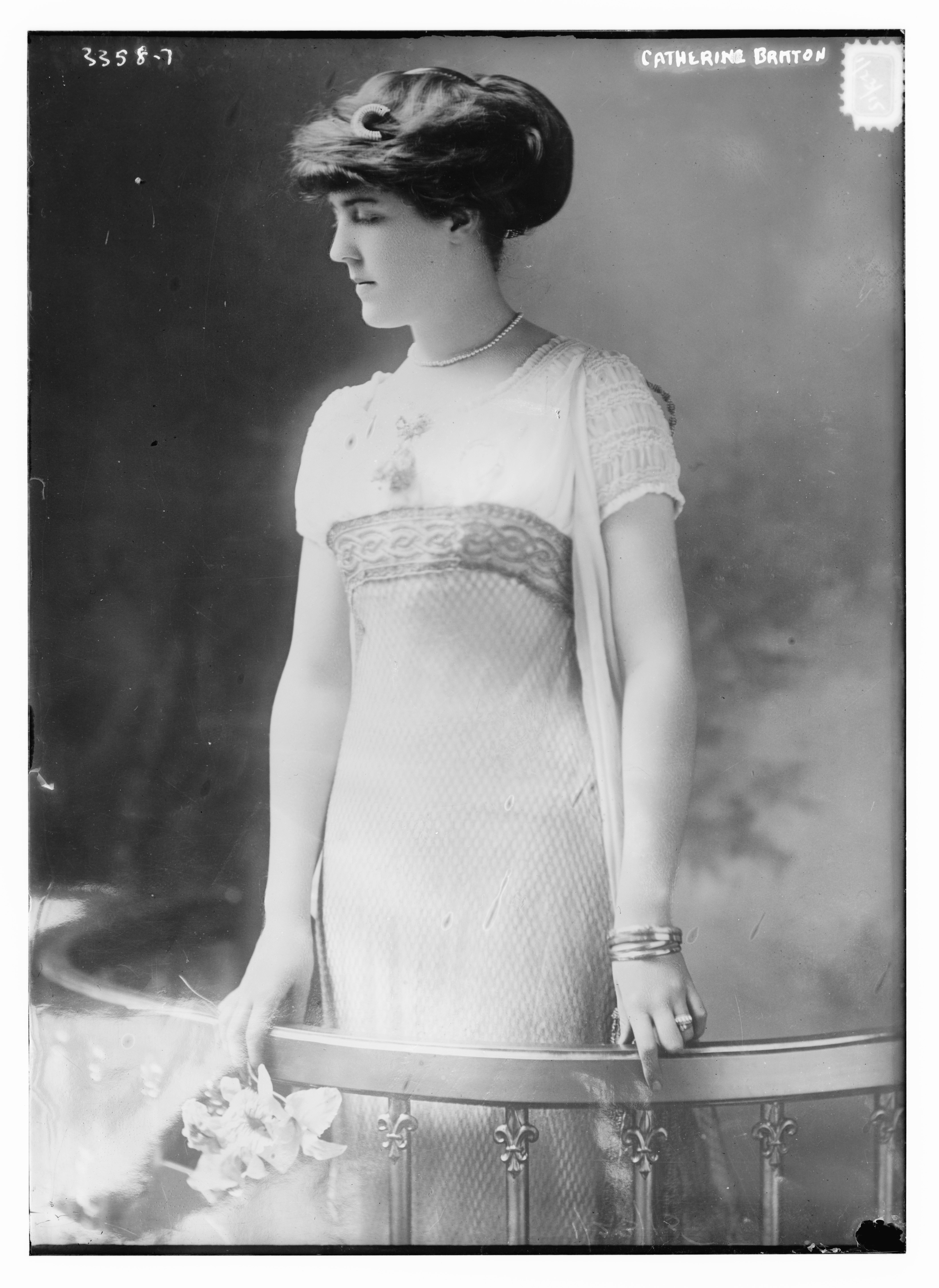
Photograph of his daughter-in-law, Princess Alfred (née Catherine Britton)

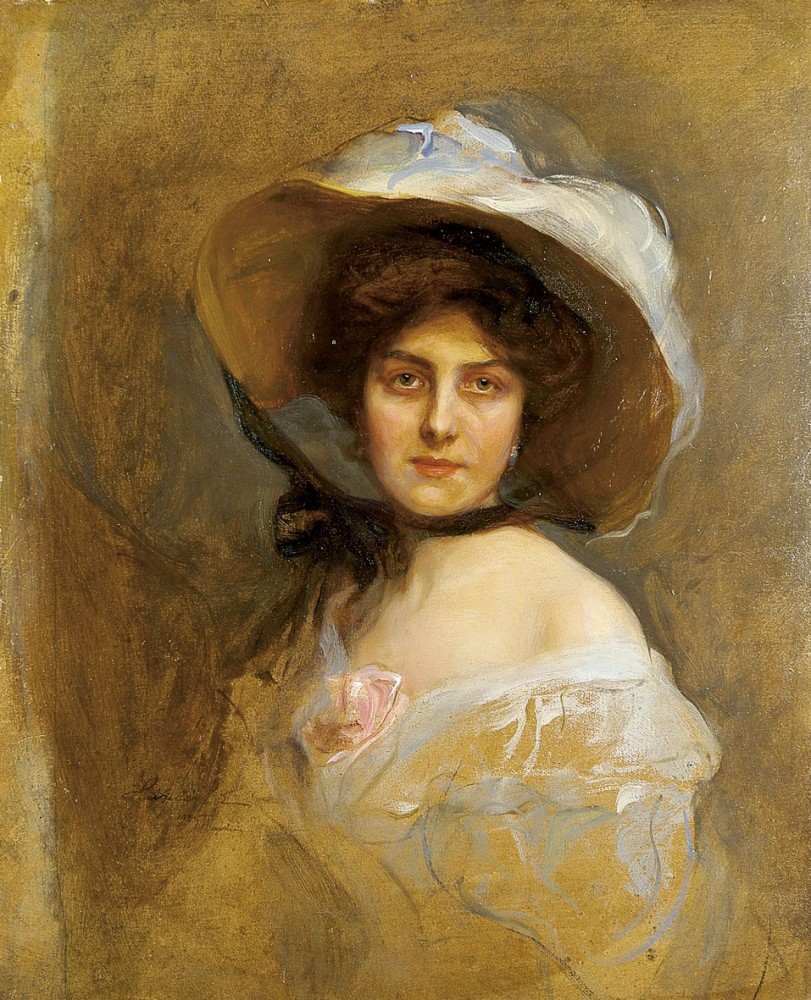
Portrait of his daughter-in-law, Princess Erwin (née Countess Alexandra Festetics), by Philip de László

In 1888, Prince Konrad married Countess Franziska von Schönborn-Buchheim (1866–1937), a daughter of Erwein, 4th Count of Schönborn-Buchheim, and Countess Franziska von Trauttmansdorff-Weinsberg. Together, they were the parents of six children, including:

- Alfred Konstantin Chlodwig Peter Maria (1889–1948), who married American Catherine Britton, a daughter of Alexander B. Britton, in 1916. After her death, he married Felicitas Aletta Mechthild (née von Schoeller) Southard, a daughter of Ritter Richard von Schoeller and former wife of James Wendell Southard.
- Erwin (1890–1950), who married Alexandra Olga Eugenia (née Countess Festetics de Tolna) Windisch-Graetz, widow of Prince Karl Otto Hugo of Windisch-Graetz who was a daughter of Prince Tasziló Festetics and Lady Mary Victoria Douglas-Hamilton (ex wife of Albert I, Prince of Monaco and daughter of the 11th Duke of Hamilton).
- Hubertus Philipp Maria (1893–1969), who married Contess Eleonora "Elly" Hadik-Barkóczy, a daughter of Count Endre Hadik-Barkóczy, Speaker of the House of Magnates, and Countess Klára Zichy de Zich et Vásonkeő.
- Franziska Anna Mayr (1895–1946), who married Baron Franz IV Mayr-Melnhof.
- Franziska Maria Anna (1897–1989), who married Archduke Maximilian of Austria, becoming the sister-in-law of Archduke Karl Franz of Austria, the last Emperor of Austria.

Prince Konrad died on 21 December 1918 while hunting in Kammern im Liesingtal, Styria.

== Ancestry ==
Ancestors of Prince Konrad of Hohenlohe-Schillingsfürst

8. Charles Albert II, 3rd Prince of Hohenlohe-Waldenburg-Schillingsfürst
4. Franz Joseph, 1st Prince of Hohenlohe-Schillingsfürst
9. Baroness Judith Reviczky of Revisnye
2. Prince Konstantin of Hohenlohe-Waldenburg-Schillingsfürst
10. Karl Ludwig, 3rd Prince of Hohenlohe-Langenburg
5. Princess Constanze of Hohenlohe-Langenburg
11. Countess Amalie Henriette of Solms-Baruth
1. Prince Konrad of Hohenlohe-Schillingsfürst
12. Ludwig Adolf Peter, 1st Prince of Sayn-Wittgenstein-Berleburg-Ludwigsburg
6. Prince Nikolaus of Sayn-Wittgenstein-Berleburg-Ludwigsburg
13. Countess Antonia Cäcilie Snarska
3. Princess Marie of Sayn-Wittgenstein-Berleburg
14. Piotr Iwanowski
7. Carolyne Iwanowska
15. Paulina Podowska
