= Prince Alfred of Hohenlohe-Schillingsfürst =

Austrian aristocrat (1889-1948)

Alfred Konstantin Chlodwig Peter Maria Prinz zu Hohenlohe-Waldenburg-Schillingsfürst (31 March 1889 – 21 October 1948) was an Austrian aristocrat and diplomat.

== Early life ==
Prince Alfred was born in Salzburg, Austria on 31 March 1889. He was the eldest son of Prince Konrad of Hohenlohe-Schillingsfürst and Countess Franziska von Schönborn-Buchheim (1866–1937). Among his siblings were Prince Erwin (who married Alexandra Olga Eugenia (née Countess Festetics de Tolna) Windisch-Graetz); Prince Hubertus (who married Contess Eleonora "Elly" Hadik-Barkóczy); Princess Franziska (who married Baron Franz IV Mayr-Melnhof); and Princess Franziska (who married Archduke Maximilian of Austria).

His paternal grandparents were Prince Konstantin of Hohenlohe-Waldenburg-Schillingsfürst, k.u.k. Chief Intendant and General of the cavalry, and Marie, née Princess of Sayn-Wittgenstein-Berleburg (a daughter of Carolyne zu Sayn-Wittgenstein, known for her liaison with Franz Liszt). Through his father, he was a grand-nephew of Viktor I, Duke of Ratibor, of Chancellor Chlodwig, Prince of Hohenlohe-Schillingsfürst, and of Gustav Adolf, Cardinal Prince of Hohenlohe-Schillingsfürst. His maternal grandparents were Erwein, 4th Count of Schönborn-Buchheim, and Countess Franziska von Trauttmansdorff-Weinsberg.

== Career ==
Prince Alfred was an officer in the Austrian cavalry and served as a chamberlain to Emperor Franz Joseph I of Austria until his death in November 1916. As an Austro-Hungarian diplomat, he served as the attaché to the embassy in Montreal (where he was arrested on "the instance of the militia headquarters" in 1914 before being released), and then in Washington, D.C. Reportedly, to stifle his romance with Catherine Britton, he was sent to the consular service in San Francisco.

At the end of World War I, he reached out to the United States, through Swiss contacts, to inform the American government that the Austrian Government desired a separate peace independent of Germany. He also warned of the rise of Bolshevikism in Austria which "may lead to chaos and anarchy against which no continental country is today immune" and to request help with the starvation threatening Austria and an end to the "military offensive now in progress is causing needless loss of life without its being possible for it to secure greater concessions since the capitulation of Austria-Hungary is already intended to be complete."

== Personal life ==
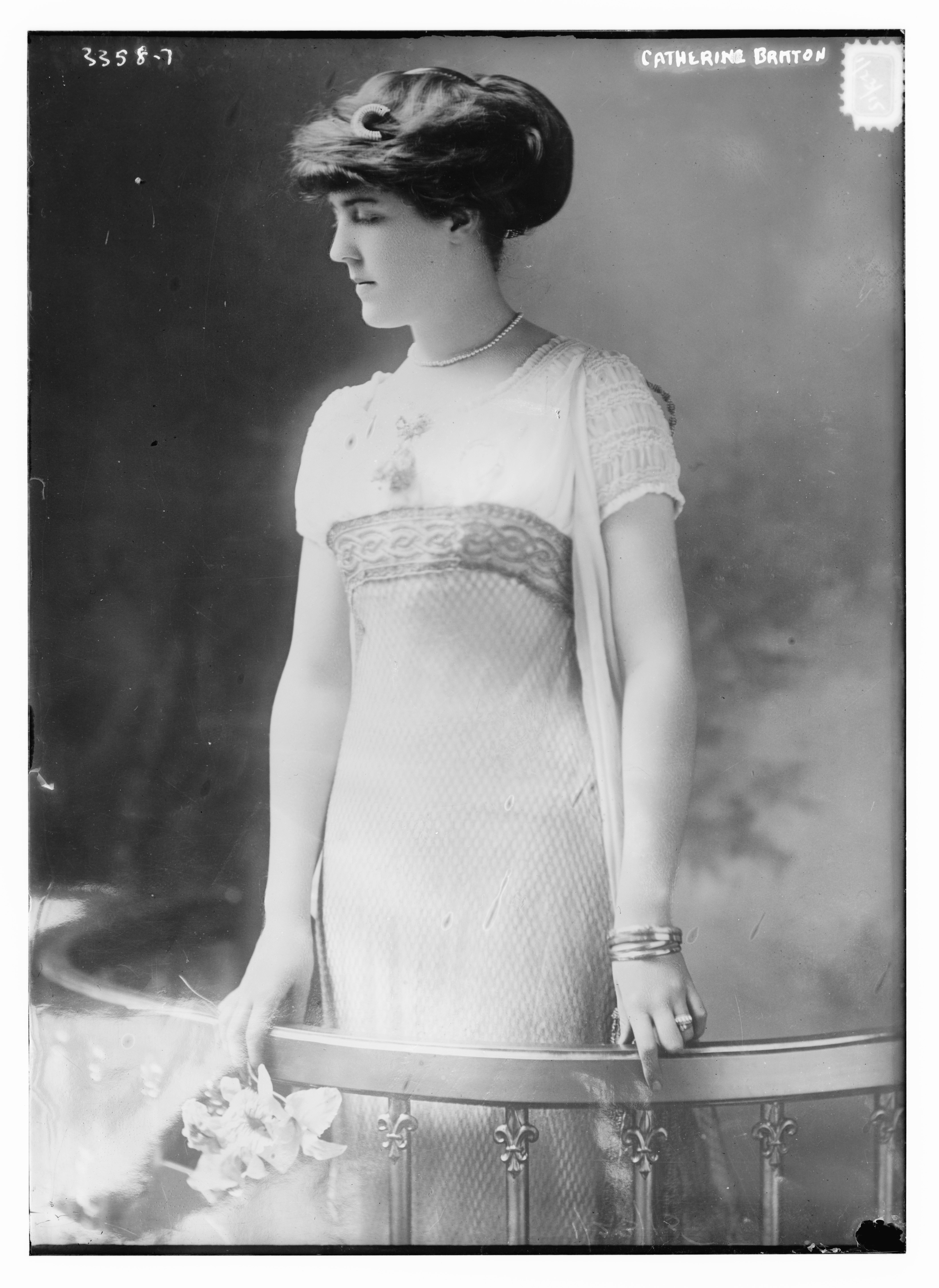
Photograph of his first wife, Catherine Britton

On 14 December 1916, Prince Alfred was married to Catherine Britton (1892–1929) at her parents' home in Washington, D.C. The best man was Stephen Hedry de Hedri et de Genere Aba, the Second Secretary of the Embassy, and the wedding was attended by Ambassador Count Johann Heinrich von Bernstorff. The couple had met shortly after Catherine returned from a brief stint working in a French hospital with Nona McAdoo, daughter of William Gibbs McAdoo, the Secretary of the Treasury. She was the eldest daughter of Washington D.c C. lawyer Alexander B. Britton and Louise Schneider (née Reed) Britton. Before her death in Vienna in 1929, they were the parents of three sons:

- Prince Alexander Konrad Maria (1918–1984), who married Margaret Thompson Schulze, a granddaughter of mining magnate William Boyce Thompson and stepdaughter of diplomat Anthony Joseph Drexel Biddle Jr., in 1939. After their divorce, she married singer Morton Downey, and he married actress Patricia "Honeychile" Wilder in 1951.
- Prince Konrad Maximilian Alfred Maria (1919–1943), who married Baroness Ladislaja Mayr von Melnhof in 1942. After his death, she married Jakob Graf zu Eltz.
- Prince Viktor Konstantin Maria (1922–2005), who married Countess Viktoria Margarita von Lüttichau in 1948.

After her death, he married Felicitas Aletta Mechthild (née von Schoeller) Southard (1900–1975) on 29 January 1934. The widow of James Wendell Southard, she was the only child of Ritter Richard von Schoeller and Emmi (née Siedenburg) von Schoeller.

Prince Alfred died in a plane crash over Prestwick, South Ayrshire, Scotland, on 21 October 1948, on his way to visit his son and his family. (Note: In 1915, Prince Alfred had survived an automobile crash in Cheshire, near Lenox, Massachusetts. During a "moonlight drive" he missed a sharp bend in the road and went over an embankment but his car was stopped, temporarily, by a wire fence allowing him just enough time to escape the car before it went over the embarkment.)
