= Tiedtke's =

Former grocery and department store chain based in Toledo, Ohio

- Type: Retail / Department Store
- Industry: Retail
- Founded: Toledo, Ohio (1894)
- Defunct: 1973
- Fate: Chapter 11 bankruptcy, Toledo location destroyed by fire in 1975
- Headquarters: Toledo, Ohio, United States
- Area served: Ohio
- Products: Grocery, clothing, toys, furniture, general merchandise
- Services: Restaurants, bakery

Tiedtke's was a former grocery and department store chain based in Toledo, Ohio. At its peak, the store, which began life as a grocery, occupied a huge building at Summit Street and Adams downtown, maintained an annex store two blocks away, and a branch store in north Toledo. It was a unique Toledo experience, and a community center. The family-founded store changed hands several times before all locations closed by 1973. The original store building was destroyed by fire two years later.

== Early history ==
The firm that would be known as Tiedtke's set up shop in 1894. Brothers Charles and Ernest Tiedtke, who grew up farming in what is today Toledo's east side, opened a grocery store at Summit and Monroe downtown (near present-day Fifth Third Field). With Toledo an important lake port, their primary business was lake traffic, delivering groceries and supplies to the freighters that would pass through on the Maumee River. Soon, business was brisk enough for them to expand and carry dry goods, as well as require a fleet of horse-and-buggies to handle the demand.

The brothers would soon take on a partner, William A. Todd, who helped generate additional lake and marine accounts for the Tiedtke brothers. The business was briefly known as Tietke and Todd, but by 1898, Todd had gone.

The Tiedtkes expanded the business further and by 1910, they had moved the business up Summit Street to the northeast corner of Adams, which it would occupy for the next six decades. With their core business food, they leased the upper floors of the building to firms selling furniture, housewares, clothing and shoes. The brothers also added a bakery, deli and restaurants. The concept was ahead of its time, a forerunner of what would be termed "one-stop shopping".

== Becoming a retail mecca ==
Another reason behind the success of the business was its commitment to its employees and to customer service. Tiedtke's would eventually need a fleet of trucks to support the deliveries being made to customers all over Toledo. The brothers were known for the gratitude they showed their employees and were often very generous. Occasionally, an employee who was ill or experiencing financial difficulties would have his medical bills or mortgage paid off by the brothers, no questions asked. The brothers helped take marketing and sales to a new level by creating elaborate displays for fruits, and vegetables, and they created their own coffee blend, Parkwood Coffee. They would often set up the ventilation system to spread the fresh-brewed coffee aroma throughout the store, luring customers to the product.

This was one of the first megastore groceries. The brothers purchased a tugboat and would sell and deliver to mariners as they went through the Maumee River on their way to the Great Lakes. Overhead trolleys in the store would move customer's change, product and receipts. The store front windows were white washed, and covered with advertisements, like a carnival side show. This was thought to cut down on the need to advertise.

In 1925, the brothers sold the business to the Kobacker family, which owned the Boston Stores chain in Columbus, Ohio and Buffalo, New York. Jerome Kobacker and his son Marvin strove to preserve the Tiedtke's brand by continuing the brothers' policies, retaining their marketing philosophy and keeping the name. They bought out the leased businesses in the Summit Street building so that everything in the six-story building was sold by Tiedtke's, making the business a full-service department store and keeping groceries the center of the business plan."

Like most large American cities at the time, the center of Toledo's commerce was its downtown core, and thanks to public transportation and its strategic location on a main artery, Tiedtke's saw a lot of foot traffic from the 1930s through the 1950s. Tiedtke's was within walking distance to at least three other major Toledo department stores, Lasalle & Koch, Lamson Brothers and the Lion Store. Unlike the other three, which were more upscale, Tiedtke's was just as elegant, but catering more to the common man, selling top-quality goods at reasonable prices.

The store would eventually cover the entire block, bounded by Summit, Adams and Water Streets. A large parking lot was laid out between the Water Street side of the store and the riverfront. Tiedtke's would eventually open an annex store just two blocks down Summit Street. As Toledo's suburbs developed, Tiedtke's opened a branch store at Greenwood Mall, an open-air shopping center on Toledo's north side.

== Decline and closure ==
In 1961, the Kobackers sold Tiedtke's to the Detroit-based department chain Federal's. They, too, retained the Tiedtke's nameplate, but made a lot of other changes, such as altering the layout of the sales floors and deemphasizing the store's core grocery business. This, along with the ongoing flight of residents from the inner-city to the suburbs, caused sales at the store to decline.

Nevertheless, the store continued to be a community center. Big and quirky events were part of its modus operandi. For example, it had a grand unveiling of a 1,000 pounds (450 kg) Wisconsin Cheddar; and in 1961 it brought in a real giant, 7 feet 4 inches (2.24 m) Jakob Nacken to celebrate its "big event."

By the early 1970s, Tiedtke's closed its downtown annex store, and Federal's had filed for Chapter 11 bankruptcy in the summer of 1972. By then, though, it was too late. Management closed the main Summit Street store for good on September 2, 1972, with just three days notice to employees.

The Tiedtke's location at Greenwood Mall hung on for another year, and it closed in 1973. A Montgomery Ward store would later occupy that space, while the downtown flagship store sat vacant and fell into disrepair.

== Fire and future of site ==
On the evening of May 7, 1975, Toledo firefighters were called to the Tiedtke's building on a report of a fire breaking out in the structure. According to the May 8 edition of the Toledo Blade, the blaze grew to a three-alarmer within an hour. Flames towered hundreds of feet into the sky and could be seen for miles, also damaging a furniture store across Adams Street. A huge crowd gathered in the former Water Street parking lot to watch the blaze, and several times they tried to break through the cordon of police and firemen.

The site was demolished and sat empty until an indoor mall, the Portside Festival Marketplace, opened on the site in 1984. The mall was unable to sustain itself at that location and it closed in 1990. Today, the site is occupied by the Imagination Station science museum, a hotel and Promenade Park, a huge riverfront space.

== See also ==
- John Tiedtke
