= Archduke Maximilian of Austria (1895–1952) =

Austrian archduke

Archduke Maximilian
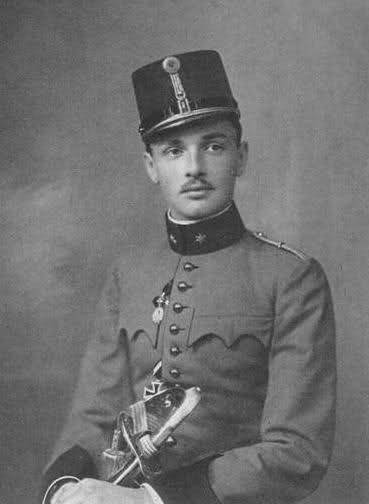
- Archduke Maximilian in 1917
- Born: 13 April 1895; Vienna, Austria-Hungary
- Died: 19 January 1952 (aged 56); Nice, France
- Spouse: Princess Franziska of Hohenlohe-Waldenburg-Schillingsfürst (m. 1917)
- Issue Detail: Archduke Ferdinand of Austria; Archduke Heinrich of Austria
Names
- Maximilian Eugen Ludwig Friedrich Philipp Ignatius Josef Maria Habsburg-Lothringen
- House: Habsburg-Lorraine
- Father: Archduke Otto of Austria
- Mother: Princess Maria Josepha of Saxony

Archduke Maximilian of Austria (Maximilian Eugen Ludwig Friedrich Philipp Ignatius Josef Maria; 13 April 1895 – 19 January 1952) was a member of the House of Habsburg-Lorraine and the younger brother of the Emperor Charles I of Austria.

== Early life ==
Maximilian was the second son of Archduke Otto of Austria and Princess Maria Josepha of Saxony.

In 1915 Maximilian was made a knight of the Order of the Golden Fleece, the special order of the dynasty, by his grand-uncle Emperor Franz Joseph I of Austria.

== Career ==
During World War I Maximilian served as a major in the Austro-Hungarian Army. He also had the rank of corvette captain in the Austro-Hungarian Navy.

In February 1917, Maximilian was sent to Berlin to formally notify the German Emperor Wilhelm II of the accession of Maximilian's brother Charles as Emperor of Austria. In 1917 / 1918, with consent of Charles I, Maximilian established his household at Belvedere Palace in Vienna, held to the disposition of the imperial family by the government of Austria.

In June 1918, Maximilian led the Austrian assault on the Dosso Alto. The air pressure of a shell which landed near him broke his ear-drum and caused a certain deafness. Maximilian was decorated with the Grand Cross of the Order of Leopold (with the war decoration and swords) for the Austrian victory. However, in August the Italians re-captured the Dosso Alto.

After the end of World War I, in December 1918 some monarchists suggested that he succeed his brother as emperor. As Charles I, not anymore participating in state affairs since November 12, 1918, still considered himself emperor, this suggestion did not conform to the family rules of the dynasty.

Meanwhile, on 12 November 1918, the Provisional National Assembly of German Austria declared the country a republic. On 3 April 1919, the Constitutional National Assembly elected in February passed the Habsburg Law which stipulated members of the former ruling family could only live in Austria if they cancelled their membership to the Habsburg Dynasty with its monarchial aspirations and if they declared themselves loyal citizens of the republic. Maximilian obviously preferred to live outside of Austria, following the example of the last imperial couple.

=== Life in exile ===
Maximilian Eugen and his family in 1919 were given permission to live in Switzerland on condition that he did not engage in political activity. (The same permission was given to Charles I, Zita and their children, who had moved there in March 1919.) Maximilian's family then moved to Bavaria, where they lived in Munich and along Lake Starnberg. Later they moved to France.

In exile Maximilian sometimes used the aliases Count Wernberg and Count von Kyburg. He graduated from law school and earned the degree Doctor of Laws.

In April 1922 Maximilian attended the funeral of his brother Charles in Funchal, Madeira, after which Zita and her children returned to mainland Europe. In June 1923 Maximilian sued his late brother's secretary Baron von Steiner for fraud in the sale of some family jewels.

In November 1930 Maximilian attended the ceremony in Ham, Belgium commemorating the coming-of-age of his nephew Otto, from then onwards until 1 January 2007 chief of the House of Habsburg-Lorraine.

In November 1933 the government of the Republic of Austria under chancellor Engelbert Dollfuss, who earlier this year had declared the parliament to have dissolved itself and did not undertake any action to hold elections, gave permission for Maximilian to reside in Austria. On 27 April 1945, the second Republic of Austria returned to the republican laws valid before dictatorial rule.

== Personal life ==
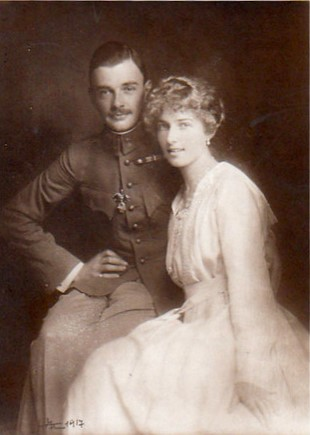
Photograph of Archduke Max of Austria and Princess Franziska of Hohelohe-Waldenburg-Schillingsfürst, 1917.

On 29 November 1917 at Schloss Laxenburg (near Vienna), Maximilian married Princess Franziska of Hohenlohe-Waldenburg-Schillingsfürst (1897–1989), daughter of Prince Konrad of Hohenlohe-Waldenburg-Schillingsfürst and Countess Franziska von Schönborn-Buchheim (1866–1937). Together, they had two sons:

- Ferdinand (1918–2004), who married Countess Helene zu Törring-Jettenbach.
- Heinrich (1925–2014), who married Countess Ludmilla von Galen.

Maximilian died on 19 January 1952 of a heart attack in a hotel in Nice; he was 56. His remains lay in a sarcophagus in the crypt of the schloss church in Altshausen (the burial place of the Dukes of Württemberg) until reburied in the collegiate church of St. Peter in Salzburg on 4 April 2019.

=== Descendants ===
Through his eldest son Ferdinand, he was a grandfather of three: Maximilian (b. 1961), Elisabeth (1957–1983) and Sophie (b. 1959).

Through his younger son, he was a grandfather of four: Philipp (b. 1961), Ferdinand Karl (b. 1965), Konrad (b. 1971) and Marie-Christine (b. 1964).
