= Josef Schmitt =

German lawyer

Ritter Josef Schmitt
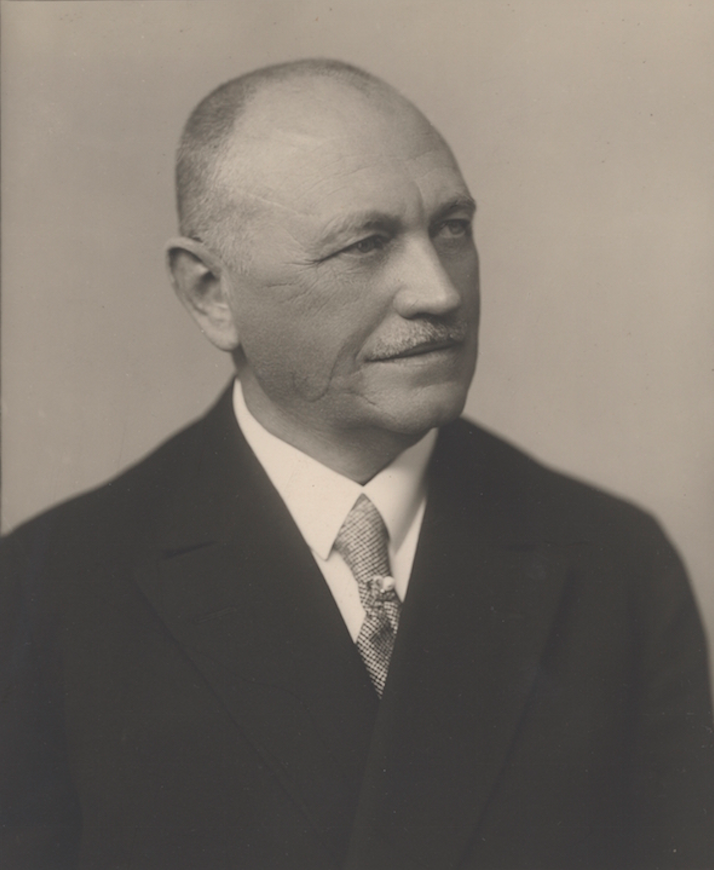

Personal details
- Born: Josef Gottfried Schmitt; 22 August 1875 Bamberg, Bavaria, German Empire
- Died: 1945 Bamberg, Bavaria, German Empire
- Spouse: Theresia Raumer (m. 1902)
- Relations: see Schmitt family
- Awards: Knight's Cross of the Order of St. Michael (Bavaria); Iron Cross II. Class

Military service
- Allegiance: German Empire
- Branch/service: Imperial German Army
- Years of service: 1914–1918
- Rank: Adjutant

Josef Schmitt (22. August 1875 – 1945), later Ritter Josef Schmitt was a German Lawyer, Knight, and Privy Councilor. He was born in Bavaria to Ritter Josef von Schmitt, who was the advisor to Prince Luitpold of Bavaria and a privy councilor. Josef Schmitt was, by 1921, Chairman of Fries & Hopflinger, the J. Mich AG in Bamberg, the AG Steinfels, formerly Hch. Knab in Steinfels, the H. Henniger Reifbräu AG in Erlangen and the Baumwollindustrie Erlangen-Bamberg AG in Erlangen. He was also a member of the supervisory boards of the AG für Licht- und Kraftversorgung in Munich, the Porzellanfabrik Kloster Veilsdorf AG , the porcelain manufacturer C. M. Hutschenreuther AG in Altrohlau and the Rizzibräu AG in Kulmbach. He was a member of the Bavarian State Committee of Deutsche Bank and Disconto-Gesellschaft and the Allianz and Stuttgarter Verein Versicherungs-AG, later Allianz.

== Early life ==
Josef was born into a devout Catholic family, and was originally brought into law through his father, Josef von Schmitt, who was a Bavarian privy councillor an advisor to the crown, and his uncle, Gottfried von Schmitt, who served as member of the Imperial Council of Bavaria, which served as the aristocratic government body of Bavaria.

=== Education and beginnings ===
After Josef Schmitt attended high school in Münnerstadt and served one year as a military volunteer, he studied law at the University of Würzburg. In 1896 he became a member of the Corps Bavaria. Schmitt later practised law from 1898 to 1901 at the District Court of Bamberg and studied in 1900 at the University of Erlangen–Nuremberg to become a doctor of law. Schmitt graduated in 1901 from the state bankruptcy and joined his father, the renowned Josef von Schmitt's law firm, which he took over in 1908. In 1902, Schmitt received the admission as a lawyer in the District Court Bamberg and in 1903 at the Higher Regional Court. During the First World War, he participated from 1914 to 1918 as Adjutant of the II. Bavarian Artillery Corps in Würzburg, at which time he was awarded an Iron Cross. At the same time, he became chairman of the board of the bar association Bamberg.

== Later life and positions ==
=== Enterprises ===
Josef Schmitt was chairman of the board of the Mechanischen Seilerwarenfabrik AG in Bamberg and the Kaliko-Fabrik AG in Bamberg. He was Deputy Chairman of the Supervisory Board of SKF, the J. Mich AG in Bamberg, the AG Steinfels, formerly Hch. Knab in Steinfels, the H. Henniger Reifbräu AG in Erlangen and the Baumwollindustrie Erlangen-Bamberg AG in Erlangen. He was also a member of the supervisory boards of the AG für Licht- und Kraftversorgung in Munich, the Porzellanfabrik Kloster Veilsdorf AG , the porcelain manufacturer C. M. Hutschenreuther AG in Altrohlau and the Rizzibräu AG in Kulmbach. He was a member of the Bavarian State Committee of Deutsche Bank and Disconto-Gesellschaft and the Allianz and Stuttgarter Verein Versicherungs-AG, later Allianz

=== Privy Councilor ===
Josef Schmitt was later appointed Privy Councilor to the crown of Bavaria. He was also awarded the Knight's cross of St. Michael and Order of Merit of the Bavarian Crown and was therefore known as Ritter Josef v. Schmitt

== Awards ==
- Appointment to the Privy Councilor
- Award of the Knight's Cross of the Order of Saint Michael
- Awarding Iron Cross II. Class
- The Order of Merit of the Bavarian Crown

== Literature ==
- Schmitt, Josef in Reich Manual of German Society – The Handbook of Personalities in Word and Image. Second Volume, p. 1668, Deutscher Wirtschaftsverlag, Berlin 1931

== See also ==
Military Order of Max Joseph
