= FinanzArchiv =

- Discipline: Economics
- Language: English

Publication details
- History: 1884 – present; volumes from 1884 through 1931 are numbered 1-48; the numbering was restarted for volumes edited by the successors of Georg von Schanz.
- Publisher: Mohr Siebeck Verlag, Tübingen (Germany)
- Frequency: quarterly

Standard abbreviations
- ISO 4: FinanzArchiv

Indexing
- ISSN: 0015-2218

Links
- Journal homepage

FinanzArchiv (Public Finance Analysis) is an international academic journal of economics published quarterly by Mohr Siebeck, Tübingen, Germany. The journal publishes high quality papers in all fields of public finance, such as taxation, public debt, public goods, public choice, federalism, market failure, social policy and the welfare state.

== Overview ==
FinanzArchiv was first published in 1884, which makes it one of the world's oldest professional journals in economics. In 2006 the traditional title was complemented by the English sub-title Public Finance Analysis.

Its founder and first editor from 1884 to 1931 was Georg von Schanz, the inventor of the Schanz-Haig-Simons concept of comprehensive income. The list of subsequent editors includes Hans Teschemacher, Fritz Neumark, Norbert Andel, Helga Pollak, Wolfgang Wiegard, Wolfram F. Richter, Hans-Werner Sinn, James R. Hines, Peter Birch Sørensen, Bernd Genser, Harry Huizinga, Jenny Ligthart, and Christian Keuschnigg.

The current editors of FinanzArchiv are Katherine Cuff, McMaster University, Ronnie Schöb, Freie Universität Berlin, and Alfons J. Weichenrieder (managing editor), Goethe University Frankfurt.

The journal is well established in public economics and keeps close relations to the International Institute of Public Finance (IIPF). 26 to 30 original scientific papers from various fields in public economics are published each year. Manuscripts must be in English and are accepted for publication subject to a peer-review process.

FinanzArchiv is listed in the Social Science Citation Index (SSCI five year impact factor: 0.312), in Current Contents/Social and Behavioral Sciences, in the Journal of Economic Literature, in IDEAS and RePEc (IDEAS impact factor 2013: 3.234), and in the International Bibliography of the Social Sciences.

For the contents of volumes published after 1999 visit the websites of FinanzArchiv or IDEAS/RePEc .

The contents of all previous volumes of FinanzArchiv starting with volume 1 (1884) to volume 48 (1932) and restarting with volume 1 (1932) to volume 59 (2002/03) are available from DigiZeitschriften .
