= Schröer =

Schröer is the name of:

- Alfred Schröer (1895–1970), German politician (KPD, SPD)
- Beatrix Schröer (born 1963), German rower
- Gustav Schröer (1846-1949), German writer
- Karl Julius Schröer (1825–1900), Austrian linguist
- Paul Berglar-Schröer (1884–1944), German writer
- Rolfrafael Schröer (born 1928), German writer
- Thomas Schröer (1946–2007), German politician
- Werner Schröer (1918–1985), German World War II fighter ace

== See also ==
- Schroer
