= Franz Xaver von Schönwerth =

German folklorist (1810-1886)

Franz Xaver von Schönwerth (16 July 1810 – 24 May 1886; born Franz Xaver Schönwerth, ennobled in 1859) was a Bavarian civil servant who was an important collector of folklore in the Upper Palatinate region.

== Life and career ==
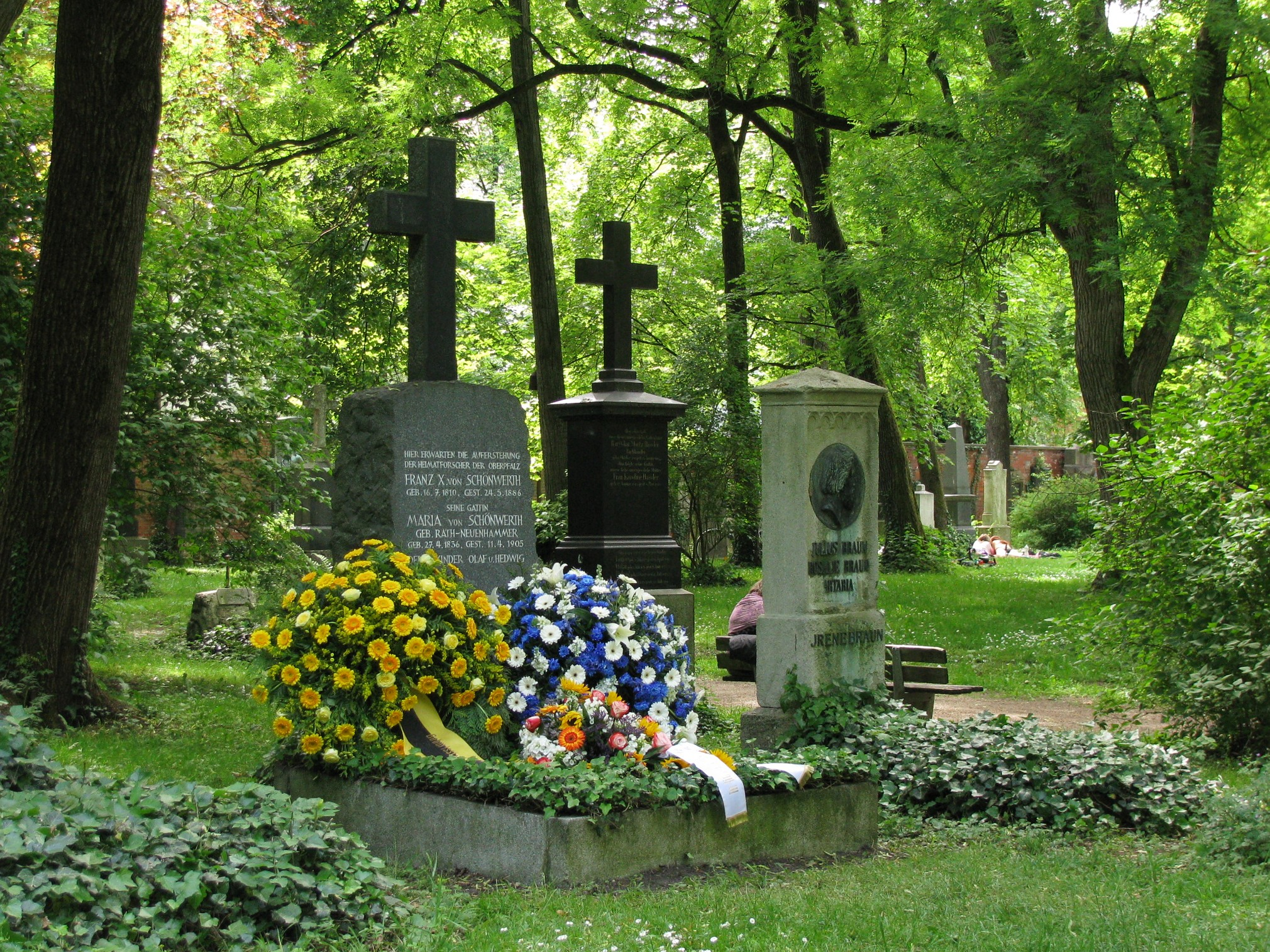
Franz Xaver von Schönwerth's grave, decorated for the 125th anniversary of his death in 2011

Schönwerth was born in Amberg as the first of five children of Joseph Schönwerth, a royal drawing professor. He entered the Erasmus Gymnasium there in 1821 and began university studies in 1832, first in construction at the Munich Academy of Art and in cameralism and mathematics, then from 1834 in law at the Ludwig-Maximilians-Universität München. He received his first permanent position with the administration of Upper Bavaria in 1840. In 1845, he became private secretary to Crown Prince Maximilian of Bavaria. In 1847, first the prince and then his wife Marie of Prussia entrusted him with managing their wealth, which he did well; during the upheavals of 1848, he disguised himself as an odd-job-man, loaded some 3 million thalers' worth of cash, securities, and valuables on a handcart, and took them to Nymphenburg Palace for safekeeping. After the prince's accession as King Maximilian II, he headed his cabinet as well as continuing to serve as his private secretary and manage his wealth; he was responsible for guiding the king in his patronage of the arts and sciences. In 1851 he was made a Regierungsrat; in 1852 he transferred to the Ministry of Finance as a Ministerialrat and in 1859 he was personally ennobled.

Schönwerth read Greek, Latin and Hebrew and also the Scandinavian languages and Gothic, and later in life studied Sanskrit and cuneiform. After beginning his folklore research, he served on the board of the Historical Association of Upper Bavaria from 1868 to 1875.

He retired in 1880 and died in Munich in 1886; he is buried in the Old North Cemetery there.

== Folklore collecting ==
Inspired by Jacob Grimm, particularly his Deutsche Mythologie, beginning in 1854, Schönwerth researched the lives of the people of the Upper Palatinate. His wife, Maria Margaretha Rath, was like him a native of the region and was able to provide him with much information about its folklore and traditions. He also drew on the knowledge of the family's housekeeper and her acquaintances in Munich, and showed an unusual ability to draw information from informants without prying, and in exchange for no more than coffee and cigars. From 1854 he also sent out a standardised questionnaire. From 1857 until 1859, he published some of his observations in a 3-volume work titled Aus der Oberpfalz—Sitten und Sagen (From the Upper Palatinate—Customs and Legends). In 1860 and 1861, he went on personal folklore collecting expeditions in the region, but most of that material remained unpublished at his death.

Schönwerth recorded legends, fairytales, comic stories, children's games, nursery rhymes, children's songs and proverbs. He also observed how people lived, describing the everyday life of peasants, their customs and their traditional costumes. Grimm wrote in a review: "Nowhere in the whole of Germany has anyone collected more circumspectly, more completely, or leaving so few traces." His questionnaires and the care with which he recorded the dialect of responses served as models as folklore collecting became more objective and scientific; Grimm, with whom he corresponded from 1858 on, recommended his methods in a letter to Karl Julius Schröer and told the king that Schönwerth was the only person who could continue his and his brother's work after their deaths. Unlike Grimm, Schönwerth did not seek a unified picture of Germanic folk culture and its pre-Christian origins, but focussed on the distinct features of the Upper Palatinate; he held a now discredited view that the regional dialect showed close parallels to Gothic.

In 2009, unpublished material collected by Schönwerth, including some 500 folktales, was discovered in Regensburg by the Oberpfalz cultural expert Erika Eichenseer, who has published some of the tales.

== Honours ==
Schönwerth was made a knight of the Bavarian Order of St. Michael in 1851 and of the Bavarian Order of the Crown in 1859. He was an honorary member of a number of German historical associations.

A memorial plaque was placed on the Schönwerth family house in Amberg in 1889. The Staatliche Realschule in Amberg has been named for him since 2010, and a "Schönwerth summer" was held in the town in 2005.

The Franz Xaver von Schönwerth Gesellschaft (Society) was founded in 2008.

== Publications ==
- Fr[anz Xaver] Schönwerth. Aus der Oberpfalz. Sitten und Sagen. 3 vols. Augsburg: Rieger, 1857, 1858, 1859. 2nd ed. repr. Volkskundliche Quellen 4, Hildesheim: Olms, 2007, ISBN 9783487133164
- F. X. v. Schönwerth. Sprichwörter des Volkes der Oberpfalz in der Mundart. From Verhandlungen des historischen Vereins von Oberpfalz und Regensburg 29. Stadtamhof: Mayr, 1873. OCLC 700906591
- Fr. X. von Schönwerth. "Johann Andreas Schmeller und seine Bearbeitung der baierischen Mundarten mit Bezugnahme auf das Oberpfälzische". Verhandlungen des historischen Vereins von Oberpfalz und Regensburg 28 (1872) 221–49

=== Posthumous editions ===
- Franz Xaver von Schönwerth. Die Rübenprinzessin und andere Märchen. Retold by J[ohann] B[aptist] Laßleben. Illustrations by Albert Reich. Kallmünz: Michael Laßleben, [1923].
- Karl Winkler (Ed.). Oberpfälzische Sagen, Legenden, Märchen und Schwänke. From Schönwerth's papers. Kallmünz: Michael Laßleben, [1935].
- Roland Röhrich (Ed.). Das Schönwerth-Lesebuch. Volkskundliches aus der Oberpfalz im 19. Jahrhundert. Oberpfälzer Sprachmosaik. Regensburg: Pustet, 1981. ISBN 3-7917-0718-3.
- Erika Eichenseer and Roland Röhrich (Ed.). Oberpfälzische Sagen und Märchen. Franz Xaver von Schönwerth centennial reader. Bezirk Oberpfalz. Regensburg: Mittelbayerische Zeitung, 1986.
- Franz Xaver von Schönwerth. Der rote Zwerg. 12 unbekannte Märchen aus der Oberpfalz. Illustrated by Irmingard Jeserick. Tr. Julia Weigl. Afterword by Lutz Röhrich. Ed. Franz Anton Niedermayr. Regensburg: Niedermayr, 2000.
- Franz Xaver von Schönwerth. Prinz Roßzwifl und andere Märchen aus der Sammlung von Franz Xaver von Schönwerth (1810–1886). Ed. Erika Eichenseer for the Schönwerth-Gesellschaft e.V. Illustrations by Barbara Stefan. Afterword by Daniel Drascek. Regensburg: Morsbach, 2010. ISBN 9783937527321.
- M. Charlotte Wolf (Tr.). Original Bavarian Folktales: A Schönwerth Selection: A Dual-Language Book. Mineola, New York: Dover, [2013]. ISBN 978-0-486-49991-8 (GoogleBooks preview).
- Maria Tatar (Tr.). The Turnip Princess and Other Newly Discovered Fairy Tales. Penguin Classics. London / New York: Penguin, 2015. ISBN 9780143107422.
- Franz Xaver von Schönwerth. White As Milk, Red As Blood: The FORGOTTEN FAIRY TALES of Franz Xaver von Schönwerth. Alfred A. Knopf. Canada, 2018. ISBN 978-0-345-81217-9

== Further information ==
=== Print ===
- Daniel Drascek, Helmut Groschwitz, Erika Lindig and Manuel Trummer (Ed.): Schönwerth – "mit so leisem Gespür gesammelt." Neue Perspektiven auf Franz Xaver von Schönwerth (1810-1886) und seine Forschungen zur Alltagskultur der Oberpfalz. Regensburger Kulturleben 5. Regensburg: Schnell & Steiner, 2011. ISBN 9783795425449.
- Roland Röhrich. Der oberpfälzische Volkskundler Franz Xaver Schönwerth – Sein Leben und sein Werk. Kallmünz: Michael Laßleben, 1975. ISBN 3-7847-1124-3.
- Roland Röhrich. "Die Gewährsleute und die Mitarbeiter des oberpfälzischen Volkskundlers Franz Xaver von Schönwerth". In: Volkskultur und Heimat. Festschrift für Josef Dünninger zum 80. Geburtstag. Ed. Dieter Harmening and Erich Wimmer. Quellen und Forschungen zur europäischen Ethnologie 3. Würzburg: Königshausen + Neumann, 1986. ISBN 9783884792452. pp. 137–47.

=== Film ===
- Schönwerths Oberpfalz – Sagengelichter. Sander-Film, Amberg/Don Bosco, Munich 2007, ISBN 978-3-7698-1634-1.
- Grüße an Herrn Wiesawittl. DVD, Sander-Film, Amberg, Hofa-Media, 2010, ISBN 978-3-00-031932-7.
