= Rabel =

Rabel may refer to:

== People ==
- Abraham Rabel or Abraham Aberle (1811–1841), Moravian Hebrew poet, translator and writer
- André-Marie Rabel (1878–1934), French fencer
- Daniel Rabel (1578–1637), French painter, engraver, miniaturist, botanist and natural history illustrator
- Ernst Rabel (1874–1955), Austrian-born American scholar of law
- Fanny Rabel (1922–2008), born Fanny Rabinovich, Polish-born Mexican artist
- Gabriele Rabel (1880–1963), Austrian physicist and botanist
- Laszlo Rabel (1937–1968), American soldier

== Places ==
- Rabel, Schleswig-Holstein, Germany

== Other ==
- Rabel (instrument)
- Rabel Journal of Comparative and International Private Law
