= Josef von Schmitt =

German judge

Geheimrat Josef Ritter von Schmitt
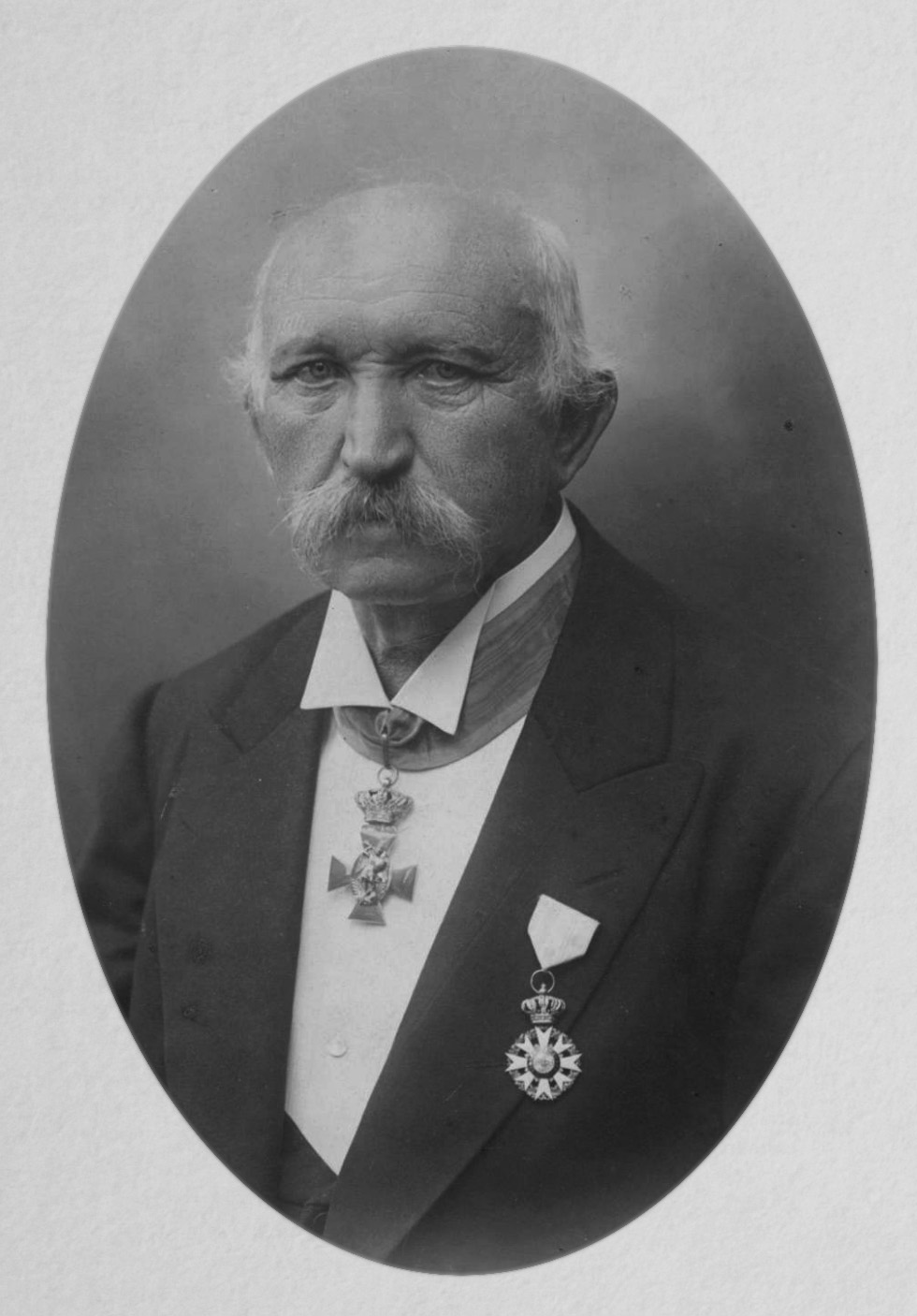

14th President of Upper Franconia
- In office 1900–1908
- Preceded by: Theodor von Muncker
- Succeeded by: Alexander von Feilitzsch

Regional Court President of Bamberg
- In office 1884–1905

Privy Councilor of Bavaria
- In office 1870–1907

Personal details
- Born: Josef Schmitt; 4 March 1838 Bamberg, Kingdom of Bavaria
- Died: 16 April 1907 (aged 69) Bamberg, Bavaria, German Empire
- Spouse: Isabella Lindner (m. 1865)
- Relatives: Son, Josef Schmitt; see Schmitt family

Josef Ritter von Schmitt (born 4 March 1838 – 16 April 1907) was a Bavarian politician and prominent jurist, who served as the 14th President of Upper Franconia from the turn of the century until his death in 1907.

A prominent figure in Bavarian politics, von Schmitt served as the President of the Court for the Kingdom of Bavaria under the Bavarian Regency, as well as the primary advisor to Prince Luitpold of Bavaria. Josef's brother, Gottfried Ritter von Schmitt, served as President of the Bavarian Supreme Court in Munich.

Aside from politics, von Schmitt was a key industrial figure in Bavaria, holding positions on multiple large Conglomerates. He was on the board of Dresdner Bank, Arnhold Brothers and from 1898 until his death he served as chairman of the board of the Schweinfurt ball producer ''Fries & Höpflinger A.G'', contributing decisively to its boom. In von Schmitt's later life, he served as privy councilor and was awarded honorary citizenship of the city of Bamberg, a city which he had previously led.

== Early life ==
Born into a middle-class family on May 4, 1838, to Joseph and Dorothea Schmitt in Hofheim, Josef attended the Munnerstadt Gymnasium, completing his schooling in 1857, after which he attended the University of Würzburg, where he was a member of the Corps Bavaria Würzburg. At University, von Schmitt read law, continuing towards his PhD at the University of Heidelberg, where he won the annual prize for his dissertation, allowing him to become a Doctor of Law.

=== Career ===
Upper Franconia within the later German state.

By 1866, von Schmitt was serving as a professor at the University of Wurzburg, where he married Maria Isabella Lindner. From here, von Schmitt was assigned to the District Court of Wurzburg, then onto Bamberg. Though he later served as Mayor of Bamberg, von Schmitt had a vast impact on the city itself. His efforts to relocate the 5th Royal Bavarian Division, which was formed on October 1, 1890, in Landau, from Bamberg, as well as his expansion of municipal water and gas services largely transformed Bamberg; a city which he, at the time, represented in the Upper Franconian council.

Acting as a highly regarded defence attorney, prosecutor and judge in his home town of Bamberg, von Schmitt was enabled to later expand his legal practice and branch into politics. Appointed to the Upper Franconian parliament, von Schmitt served as its president for many years. von Schmitt's brother, Gottfried, followed a similar path, later becoming President of the Bavarian Supreme Court.

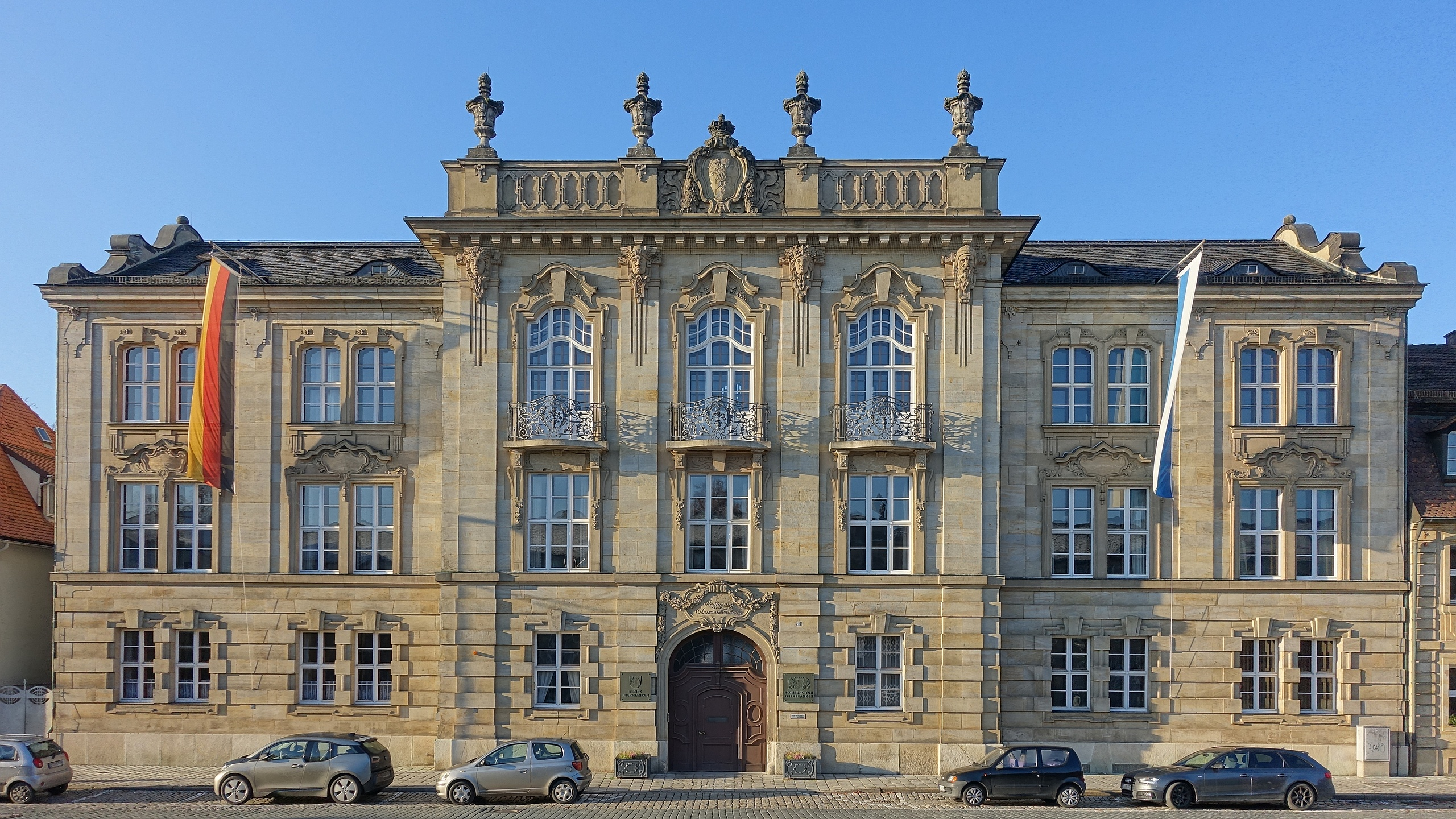
The Upper Franconian Presidential Palace, completed during v. Schmitt's term.

From 1870, Schmitt held the prestigious title of a Royal Lawyer of Bamberg, working directly with the crown of Bavaria. The profession of lawyer was at that time a state-assigned department. From 1884 to 1905 he was Regional Court President in Bamberg. He later became a Bavarian Privy Councillor

== Business enterprises ==
Dr. Fritz Neumeyer, Director Wilhelm Höpflinger, Director Engelbert Fries, Supervisory Board Dr. Kruger; back from left: supervisory board chairman Dr. Josef Schmitt, AR Privy Councilor Dr. Ernst Sachs and AR Consul Dr. Heinrich Arnhold

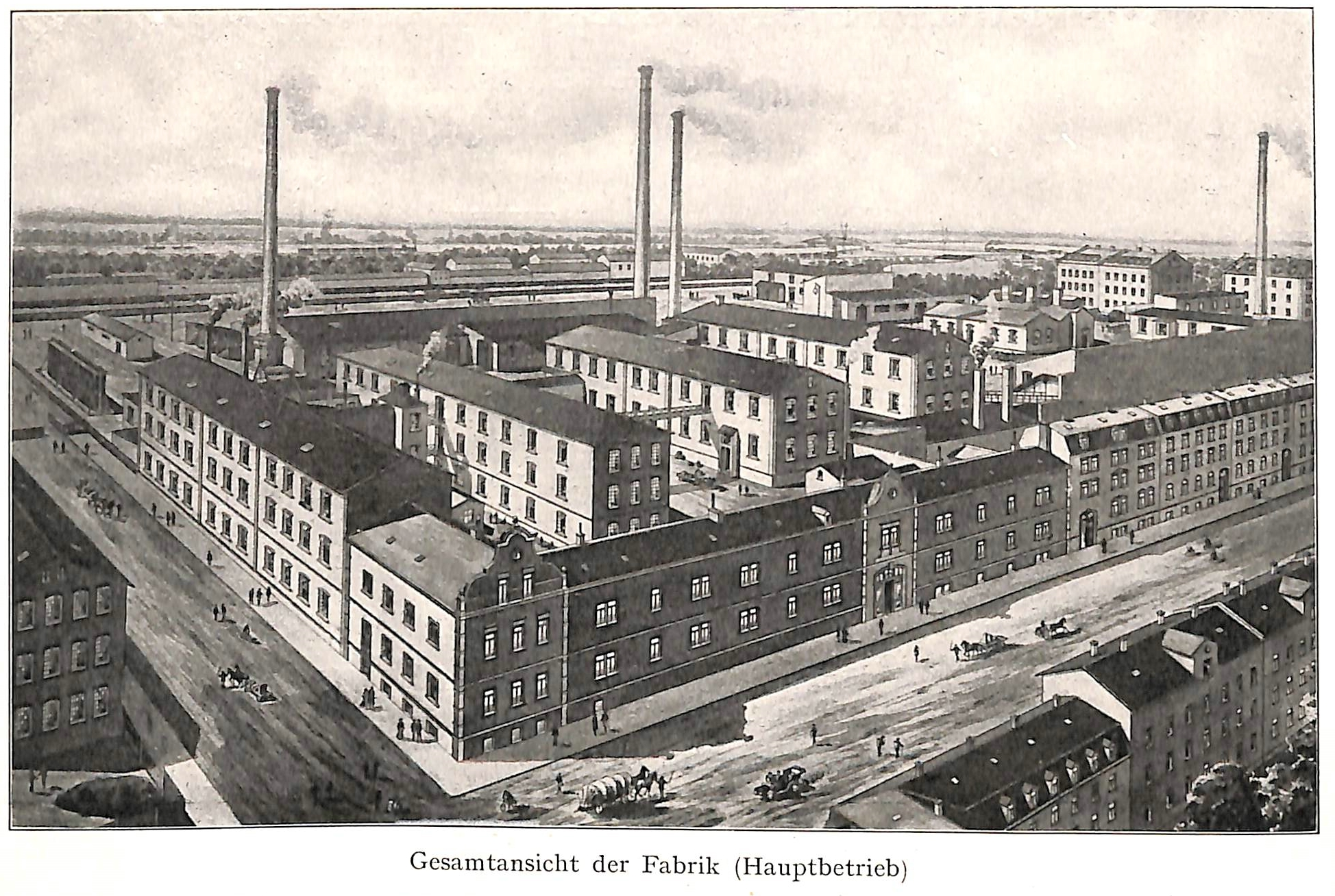
The Fries & Hopflinger Factory.

Schmitt was also, notably, an extremely successful businessman. In Gründerzeit, he was involved in numerous start-ups. He was on the board of Dresdner Bank, Arnhold Brothers. From 1898 until his death he served as chairman of the board of the Schweinfurt ball producer " Fries & Höpflinger A.G" which later merged to become the conglomerate SKF, and Schmitt contributed decisively to the boom of the company.

Schmitt also performed a number of honorary functions, these included being chairman of the Community Plenipotentiary Collegium and president of the district administrators in Bamberg.

== Honours ==
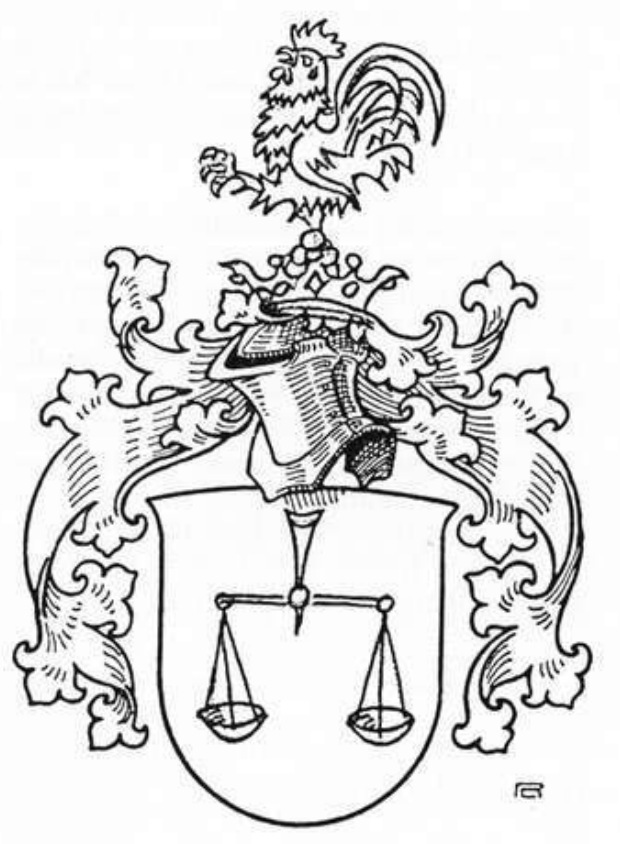
Coat of arms of Ritter Josef von Schmitt, Granted by Luitpold, Prince Regent of Bavaria

On September 26, 1889, von Schmitt was granted honorary citizenship of Bamberg for his extraordinary efforts. The main street in Bamberg, "Dr.-von-Schmitt-Straße" also bears his name today.

In 1896 Prince Regent Luitpold, Prince Regent of Bavaria awarded him the Ritterkreuz of Order of Merit of the Bavarian Crown. With the award of the title and he was entered into German nobility with the title of Dr. Josef Ritter von Schmitt; Ritter is a hereditary title roughly equivalent to the British Baronet.

In the week of his death, von Schmitt was presented a commemorative sheet by the Lutz Lord Mayor.

== Notes ==
- Ritter is a German hereditary title of nobility, passed through male line descendants. It translates to Imperial Knight.

== Literature ==
- Heinz F. Fränkel: Bamberger Straßennamen.
- Werner Schubert (2007). "Schmitt, Gottfried von". Neue Deutsche Biographie (in German). Vol. 23. Berlin: Duncker & Humblot. p. 234. (full text online). (Nebeneintrag)
- Lothar Dorn: Zwei bedeutende Brüder aus Hofheim. Die Brüder Gottfried und Joseph Ritter von Schmitt. In: Chronik der Stadt Hofheim und ihrer Stadtteile. Arbeitskreis Hofheimer Stadtgeschichte. (Hrsg.). Hofheim 1993, S. 93–98.
