= Felix Leonhard Giesebrecht =

German and Prussian lawyer and politician (1828–1901)

Mayor of Szczecin
- In office 1884–1900
- Preceded by: Friedrich Sternberg
- Succeeded by: Friedrich Roth

Personal details
- Born: 6 August 1828 Szczecin, Kingdom of Prussia (now part of Poland)
- Died: 18 November 1901 (aged 73) Szczecin, Kingdom of Prussia, German Empire (now part of Poland)
- Occupation: Lawyer, politician

Felix Leonhard Giesebrecht (German: [ˈfeːlɪks ˈleːɔnaʁd ˈɡiːzl̩bʁɛçt]; 6 August 1828 – 18 November 1901) was a German and Prussian lawyer and politician. From 1884 to 1900, he served as the mayor of the city of Szczecin, then located in the Province of Pomerania within the Kingdom of Prussia, which was a part of the German Empire, and now is located in the West Pomeranian Voivodeship, Poland. From 1900 until his death in 1901, he was a privy councillor at the royal court of Prussia.

== Biography ==
Felix Leonhard Giesebrecht was born on 6 August 1828 in the city of Szczecin, then located in the Province of Pomerania within the Kingdom of Prussia, and now within the West Pomeranian Voivodeship, Poland. He finished an intermediate school in Szczecin, and later studied law in the city of Bonn, Germany. During his studies, he was a member of the fraterneity Bonner Burschenschaft Frankonia. In 1852, he became a legal trainee, and in 1858, an assessor, and later the same year, he was appointed as a municipal lawyer of Szczecin. From 1884 to 1900, he served as the mayor of Szczecin, then a part of the German Empire. In 1889, he was awarded the Order of the Red Eagle, fourth class. In 1900, he became a privy councillor at the royal court of Prussia. He died on 18 November 1901 in Szczecin.

== Orders and decorations ==
- Order of the Red Eagle, fourth class (1889)
