= The Turnip Princess and Other Newly Discovered Fairy Tales =

Collection of fairy tales by Franz Xaver von Schönwerth

- Editor: Erika Eichenseer
- Author: Franz Xaver von Schönwerth
- Translator: Maria Tatar
- Illustrator: Engelbert Süss
- Language: English
- Genre: Fairy tales
- Publisher: Penguin Books
- Publication date: 24 February 2015
- Publication place: United States
- Pages: 264
- ISBN: 978-0-698-14455-2

The Turnip Princess and Other Newly Discovered Fairy Tales, usually shortened to The Turnip Princess, is a collection of German fairy tales recorded by Franz Xaver von Schönwerth during his lifetime, in the 19th century. Erika Eichenseer, the scholar who found those recordings, chose 72 tales to publish as a book, with translations by Maria Tatar, responsible for the program in folklore and mythology at Harvard University.

The collection was published in 2015 by Penguin Books as part of Penguin Classics, with notes by Tatar.

== Publishing history ==
The Turnip Princess was the second modern publication of Schönwerth's collections, being preceded by Original Bavarian Folktale, edited and translated by Charlotte Wolf. While Wolf's edition focus mostly on stories that appear in a 1850s collection published by Schönwerth himself, Eichenseer's contain mostly those stories that were discovered only recently.

== Reception ==
Most critics noted the narrative's simplicity, usually stating things as they are, which is attributed to Schönwerth's attempt to keep the authenticity of the stories. Writing for The Washington Post, Michael Dirda also comments how "Schönwerth's style is generally austere," although he sometimes uses a more poetic language to describe characters or actions.

Mark Lundy notes that, unlike the Grimm Brothers or Charles Perrault, Schönwerth's tales lean closer to authenticity, which gives them "a fierce and nimble energy". Lundy also comments on Schönwerth's lack of concern "with realism or character psychology" for most of the tales, which serves to show their origin as "fanciful diversions from the drabness of the everyday," instead of stories trying to push a specific moral lesson.

In her side by side review of Wolf's Original Bavarian Folktale and Eichenseer's The Turnip Princess, storyteller Csenge Virág Zalka contrasted the types of stories chosen by the editors of each book. To Zalka, Eichenseer's choice to go with tales that are more similar in tone to the fairy tales that people are already used to resulted in her book receiving more attention than Wolf's, who chose stories that more closely related to Schönwerth's own choices. Zalka also praised Tatar's commentaries and notes present in the book, saying it turns the book into a "very useful resource for folklorists, storytellers, and other story professionals".

== See also ==
- List of fairy tales
