= Ambros Kutscha =

Czech nobleman

Ambros Kutscha (1769 in Kroměříž – 16 October 1845 in Prague) was a Czech nobleman. He was Doctor of Laws, who served as a judge (Hofrat) and later as Vice President (from 1842) of the High Court of the Kingdom of Bohemia (Appellations- und Criminal-Obergericht in dem Königreiche Böhmen). He was awarded the knight's cross of the Order of Leopold on 12 January 1837, an award which conferred hereditary nobility and the rank and title of Ritter (knight). He was subsequently known as Ambros, Ritter von Kutscha.

== See also ==
- List of Bohemian monarchs
