= Henry Calvert Simons =

American economist (1899–1946)

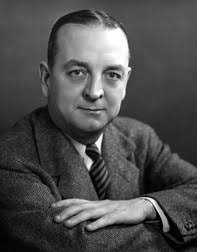
- Born: October 9, 1899; Virden, Illinois, U.S.
- Died: June 19, 1946 (aged 46); Chicago, Illinois, U.S.

Academic background
- Education: University of Michigan (BA); University of Chicago
- Influences: Frank H. Knight

Academic work
- Discipline: Economics
- School or tradition: Chicago School of Economics

Henry Calvert Simons (/ˈsaɪmənz/; October 9, 1899 – June 19, 1946) was an American economist at the University of Chicago. A protégé of Frank Knight, his antitrust and monetarist models influenced the Chicago school of economics. He was a founding author of the Chicago plan for monetary reform that found broad support in the years following the 1930s Depression, which would have abolished the fractional-reserve banking system, which Simons viewed to be inherently unstable. This would have prevented unsecured bank credit from circulating as a "money substitute" in the financial system, and it would be replaced with money created by the government or central bank that would not be subject to bank runs.

Simons is noted for a definition of economic income, developed in common with Robert M. Haig, known as the Haig–Simons equation.

== Work ==
=== Program of reform ===
In one of his essays, A Positive Program for Laissez Faire (1934) Simons set out a program of reform to bring private enterprise back to life during the Great Depression.

Eliminate all forms of monopolistic market power, to include the breakup of large oligopolistic corporations and application of antitrust laws to labor unions. A Federal incorporation law could be used to limit corporation size and where technology required giant firms for reasons of low cost production the Federal government should own and operate them... Promote economic stability by reform of the monetary system and establishment of stable rules for monetary policy... Reform the tax system and promote equity through income tax... Abolish all tariffs... Limit waste by restricting advertising and other wasteful merchandising practices.

Henry Simons argued for changing the financial architecture of the United States to make monetary policy more effective and mitigate periodic cycles of inflation and deflation. The goal of changing the "monetary rules of the game" in this way was to "prevent... the affliction of extreme industrial fluctuations".

=== Corporate finance and the business cycle ===
Simons identified a critical flaw in the existing financial system: the perpetuation of economic disturbances through "extreme alternations of hoarding and dis-hoarding" of money. He argued that short-term obligations issued by banks and other corporations created "abundant money substitutes during booms," but when demand weakened, liquidation attempts resulted in devastating "fire sales."

His analysis foreshadowed events such as the 2008 Bear Stearns bailout, which required a Federal Reserve intervention of up to $30 billion to prevent a systemic collapse of financial markets.

=== The Chicago Plan for banking reform ===
Simons and other economists developed the Chicago Plan, which proposed fundamental changes to the banking system:

==== Full-reserve banking ====
The plan called for banks to hold 100% reserves against deposits, eliminating the risk of bank runs. This would effectively end fractional-reserve banking and prevent banks from creating money through lending.

In Simons' ideal economy, nothing would be circulated but "pure assets" and "pure money," rather than "near moneys," "practically moneys," and other precarious forms of short-term instruments that were responsible for much of the existing volatility. Simons opposed the issuance of short-term debt for financing public or corporate obligations. He also opposed the payment of interest on money, demand deposits, and savings. Simons envisioned private banks which played a substantially different role in society than they currently do. Rather than controlling the money supply through the issuance of debt, Simons' banks would be more akin to "investment trusts" than anything else.

In the interest of stability, Simons envisioned banks that would have a choice of two types of holdings: long-term bonds, or consols, and cash. Simultaneously, they would hold increased reserves, up to 100%. Simons saw this as beneficial in that its ultimate consequences would be the prevention of "bank-financed inflation of securities and real estate" through the leveraged creation of secondary forms of money.

Simons advocated the separation of deposit and transaction windows and the institutional separation of banks as "lender-investors" and banks as depository agencies. The primary benefit would be to enable lending and investing institutions to focus on the provision of "long term capital in equity form" (233). Banks could be "free to provide such funds out of their own capital". Short-term interest-based commercial loans would be phased out, since one of the "unfortunate effects of modern banking," as Simons viewed it, was that it had "facilitated and encouraged the use of short-term financing in business generally".

=== Monetary policy philosophy ===
Simons advocated for stabilizing the value of money as measured by price indices, consistent with maintaining adequate employment. His approach emphasized:

- Minimal short-term borrowing
- Regulating banks very closely
- Preventing "cumulative maladjustment"
- Opposition to the gold standard
- Advocacy for non-interest-bearing government debt

He argued that a financial system where price levels depended on the creation and liquidation of short-term securities was inherently problematic and threatened economic stability.
