= JZ =

JZ, J/Z, or J-Z may refer to:

People:

- Jay-Z (born 1969), American rapper and business executive
- John Zachary Young (1907–1997), English zoologist
- J. Z. Knight (born 1946), American psychic
- Gesias Calvancanti (born 1983), Brazilian mixed martial artist
- Jacob Zuma (born 1942), South African politician

Other uses:

- JZ (x86 instruction) ("jump on zero"), an Intel x86 assembly language instruction
- J/Z (New York City Subway service)
- Toyota JZ engine, a straight-6 automobile engine
- Jugoslovenske Železnice, the Yugoslavian state railway
- Skyways (airline) (IATA code: JZ)
- JuristenZeitung, common abbreviation of the German law journal
