= Schmitt family =

Bavarian noble family

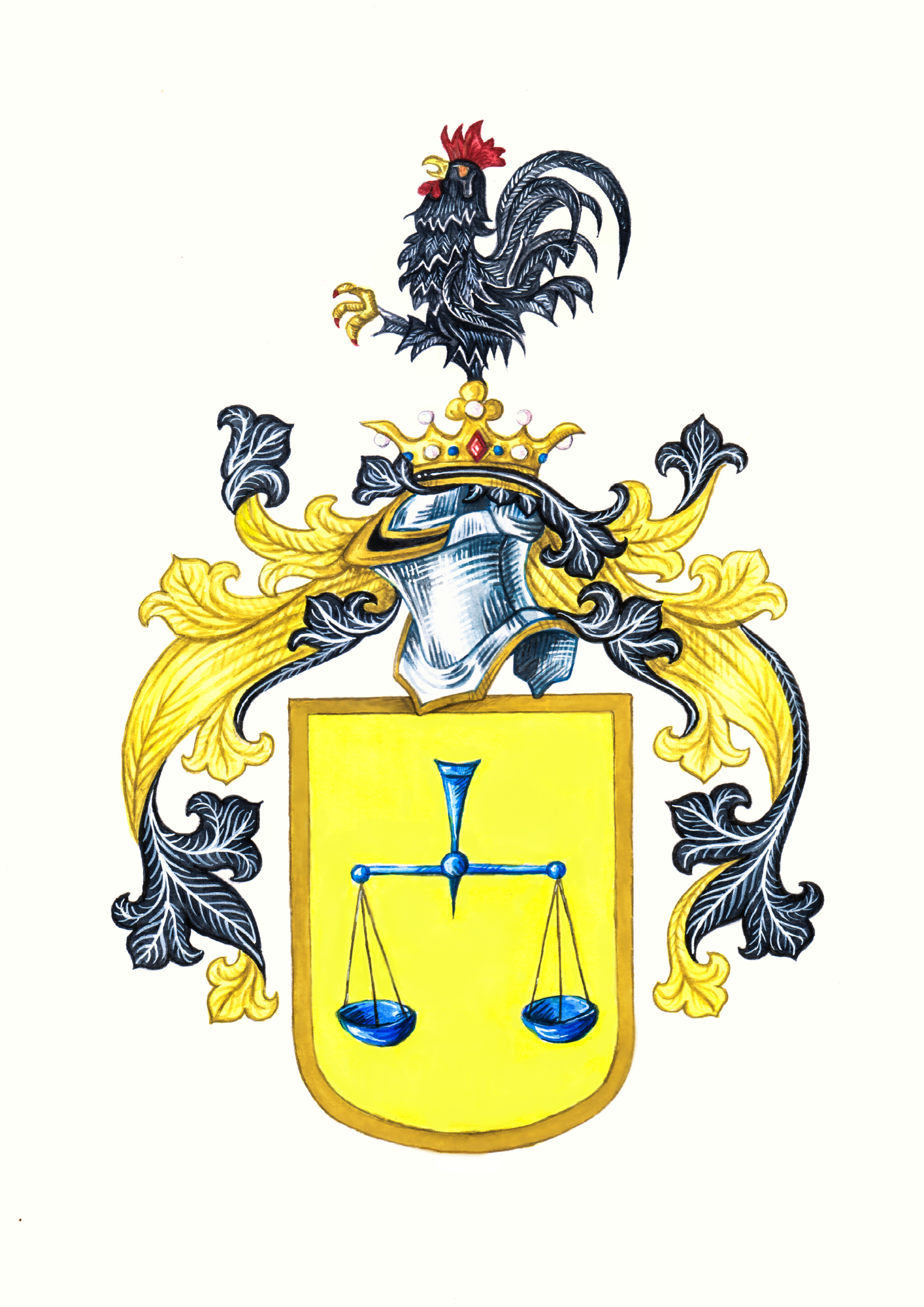
Coat of arms granted to Ritter Josef von Schmitt and Ritter Gottfried von Schmitt by Luitpold, Prince Regent of Bavaria

The Schmitt family or von Schmitt is a Bavarian noble family with Franconian origin. Introduced to nobility as Ritter von Schmitt by Luitpold, Prince Regent of Bavaria and Otto, King of Bavaria, the family has been prominent in business, law and politics. Members have included the 14th President of Upper Franconia, the President of the Supreme Court of the Kingdom of Bavaria, and the Senate President of the Reichsgericht.

== History ==
The first known ancestor was Johannes Kaspar I. Schmitt (d. 1721–72) who was from Bamberg in Bavaria, Germany. His descendants Josef (1838–1908) and Gottfried (1827–1908) were later elevated to nobility. Josef Ritter von Schmitt and Gottfried Ritter von Schmitt (1827–1908), were elevated to the hereditary title of Ritter in 1889 and 1896 respectively before the Weimar Republic's abolition of nobility in 1919.

Josef v. Schmitt's son Josef II was a prominent businessman and privy councilor, co-chairing SKF and others. His cousin, Gottfried II (1865–1919) was a German politician, and member of the Reichsgerichtsrat.

== Notable family members ==
- Josef Ritter von Schmitt (1838—1908), President of Upper Franconia.
- Josef Schmitt (1875–1945), German businessman and privy councillor.
- Gottfried Ritter von Schmitt (1827–1908), President of the Bavarian Supreme Court.
- Gottfried Schmitt (1865–1919), German politician
- Gottfried E. Schmitt (1940 –), German winemaker
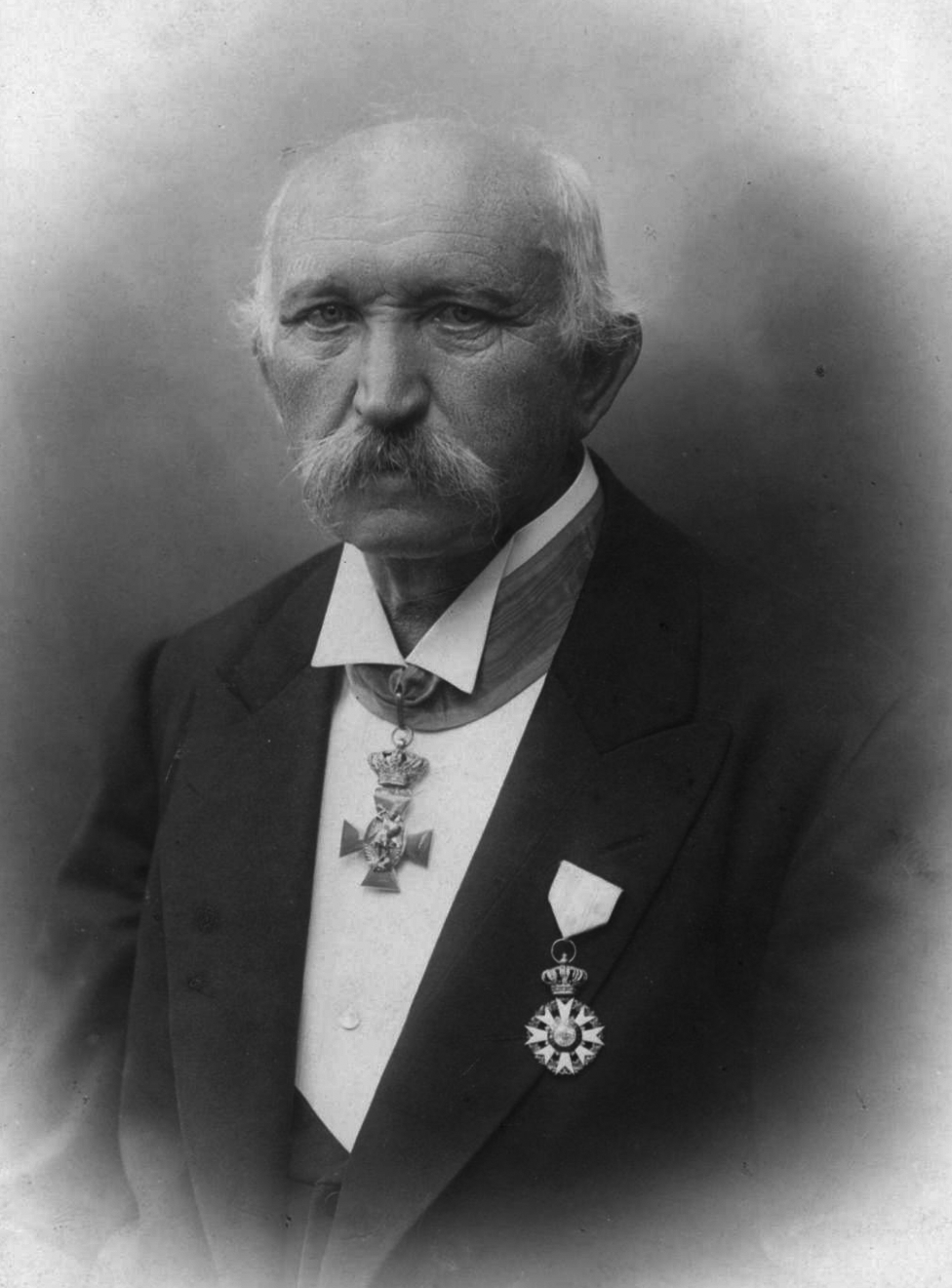
Josef Ritter von Schmitt

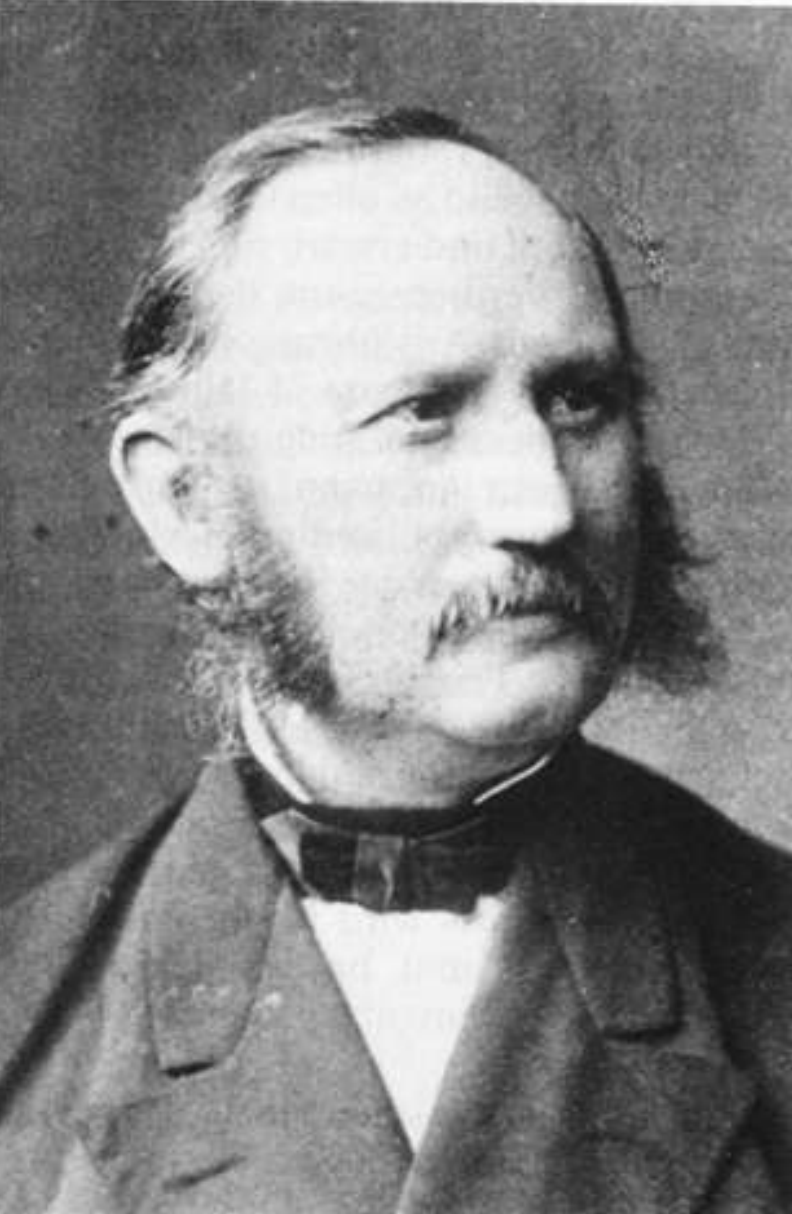
Gottfried Ritter von Schmitt

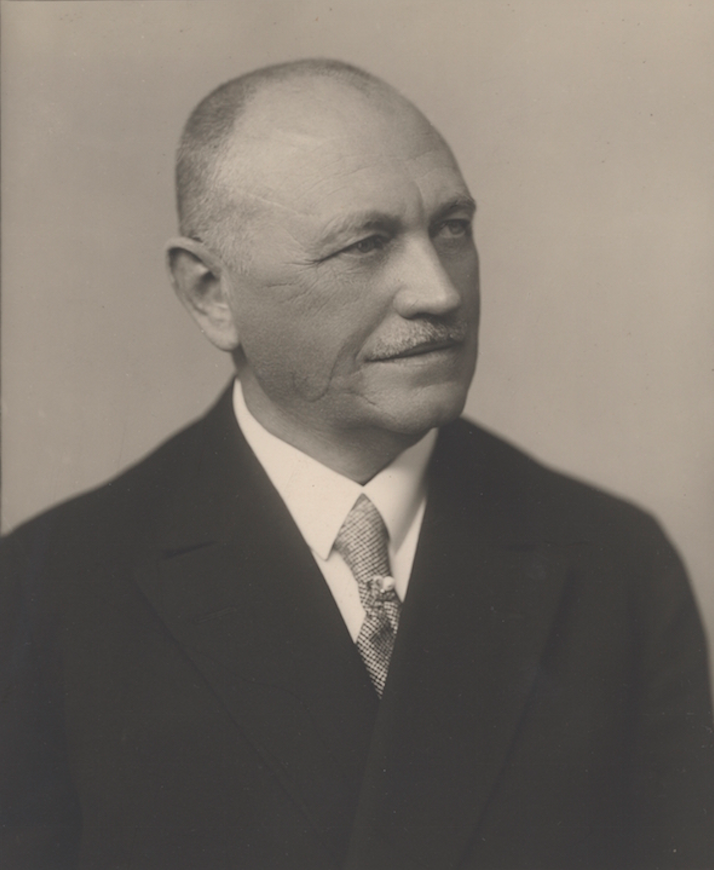
Ritter Josef Schmitt
