= Katherine Cuff =

Canadian economist

Academic background
- Education: Queen's University; York University

Academic work
- Discipline: Optimal Taxation; Fiscal Federalism; Tax Competition
- Institutions: McMaster University
- Website: Information at IDEAS / RePEc

Katherine Cuff is a Canadian economist who currently serves as Professor of Economics at McMaster University. She holds the Canada Research Chair in Public Economic Theory and has been recognized as a McMaster University Scholar. Cuff also serves as Managing Editor of the Canadian Journal of Economics and editor of the FinanzArchiv (Public Finance Analysis).

== Biography ==
Cuff obtained a Bachelors of Arts in Economics with Honours at Queen's University in 1994, then went on to complete a Masters of Arts in Economics at York University in 1995. In 2000, she completed a Ph.D in Economics from Queen's University with her doctoral thesis, Three Essays on Optimal Redistributive Policies. Cuff then joined McMaster University's Department of Economics as an Assistant Professor until 2006, when she became an Associate Professor within the department. In 2016, she was conferred as a tenured Professor of Economics at McMaster University, where she remains at present. Cuff is faculty member of the McMaster Decision Science Laboratory (McDSL), an experimental economics research centre, where she focuses on the topic of funding and financing issues in Canadian healthcare.

== Selected publications ==
=== "Optimal unemployment insurance and redistribution" (2018) ===
Cuff and Robin Boadway undertake an analysis of unemployment insurance and redistributive taxes and transfers in a framework that acknowledges the employment choices of individuals with varying levels of skilled talent. A literature review finds that existing literature on the topic of optimal unemployment insurance is primarily concerned with the moral hazard issues associated with insurance policies, where individuals with insurance may feel a false sense of protection from it and then engage in risky behaviour that they would not otherwise condone. Using a model that utilizes an adaptation of an extensive-margin approach, while taking into account involuntary unemployment due to search frictions whereby individuals may decide themselves how intensely to search for work, the paper tests a number of propositions on optimal wage taxes and income transfers. The paper finds that an optimal policy would address large-scale effects of changes in wages using a "piecewise linear wage tax", or an income bracket-based approach to taxation that is able to address a variety of different levels of skilled work and productivity. Meanwhile, specific employment taxes and unemployment insurance remain available for redistribution without being overly concerned by potential repercussions of the insurance-moral hazard issue.

=== "Should I stay or should I go? Exit options within mixed systems of public and private health care finance" (2016) ===
A comparative study of mixed public-private finance in healthcare systems that compares the conditions by which users are able to fully exit from the public system and purchase private insurance, and investigates the reasoning behind such exit decisions. The authors used a controlled laboratory experiment that allowed for either 'universal-exit', where any household regardless of income may exit, or 'conditional-exit', where only individuals who satisfy certain conditions may exit—for purposes of the experiment, the set condition was high-income. The study confirmed predictions that when presented with the opportunity to exit, high-income individuals generally will generally take it. However, contrary to initial predictions, the results showed that high-income earners are less likely to exit under a universal-exit scenario than a conditional-exit despite identical incentives in both scenarios. The paper offers three potential explanations for why high-income individuals were less likely to exit in a universal-exit scenario: altruism, priming bias, and time-constraint. The first explanation is that high-income individuals may stay and support the public system because they are concerned that, upon seeing all the high-income individuals exiting, low-income individuals will follow suit, leading to the collapse of the public system. Second, a priming bias where high-income individuals might recognize the incentive to exit the system, but feel an obligation to help maintain the public system. This may occur when they feel that "the environment into which they are placed is an environment primed with public provision." Finally, it might be that it simply takes time for individuals to realize their incentive to exit the public system. Were the slow collapse and unraveling of the public system to take place at a faster rate, these individuals would then also exit sooner. The paper concludes that individuals in the "upper three quintiles" would above-all prefer a purely private healthcare system over any type of public system exit, while the rest of the population should strongly prefer a purely publicly financed system without any type of exit option. In an environment where majority-voting is the primary mechanism by which the system is chosen, the latter would win out over any other possible combination.

=== "Capital tax competition and returns to scale" (2005) ===
This paper by Cuff and John Burbridge examines capital tax competition in different regions through a comparison of Nash equilibria using variations of the standard capital tax model. The conclusion finds that inefficiencies in both capital and head taxes can be attributed to regions' incentives to manipulate the terms of trade, rather than any difference in increasing returns.

=== "Equalization and the Decentralization of Revenue–Raising in a Federation" (2003) ===
Cuff and Maurice Marchand study a combination of federalism and economics to determine what specific fiscal policies and intergovernmental transfers are required for federal economies that possess regional governments responsible for public services. According to their study, when labour is homogeneous, a wide variety of regional taxation policies can be utilized for purposes of redistribution so long as there is an optimal equalization scheme in place without concern for the cost of migration . On the other hand, if labour is heterogeneous, the costliness of inter-regional migration does have an effect on optimal policies. When migration is costless, "the set of instruments that can be used to decentralize the unitary state optimuum" is less broad, while when migration is costly, the central government must specifically introduce some incentive to encourage regional governmental redistribution of resources.

== Professional affiliations ==
- Affiliate Member, Behavioural Experiments in Health Network, April 2016–present.
- Network Member, Oslo Fiscal Studies, University of Oslo, June 2014 –present.
- Elected Member, Board of Management, International Institute of Public Finance, August 2011 –August 2014 and re-elected August 2014 –August 2017.
- Associate Member, Centre Interuniversitaire sur le Risque, les Politiques Économiques et l'Emploi (CIRPÉE), Montreal, Quebec, Canada, 2002 –2010.

== Honours ==
- McMaster University, University Scholar, 2015 –2019. Canada Research Chair in Public Economic Theory, Tier II, 2009 –2014, renewed 2014 –2019.
- C.A. Curtis Prizefor Best Doctoral Thesis in Economics, Queen's University, 2002.
- Social Sciences and Humanities Research Council Doctoral Fellowship, 1997 –1999.
- Pacific Institute for the Mathematical Sciences Graduate Travel Award, 1998.
- International Institute of Public Finance Young Scholar's Award, 1998.
- Ontario Graduate Scholarships, 1995 –1997.York University Scholarship, 1994.
- Queen's University Dean's Special Award, 1993
