= Order of Merit of the Bavarian Crown =

Order of Merit of the Bavarian Crown Verdienstorden der Bayerischen Krone
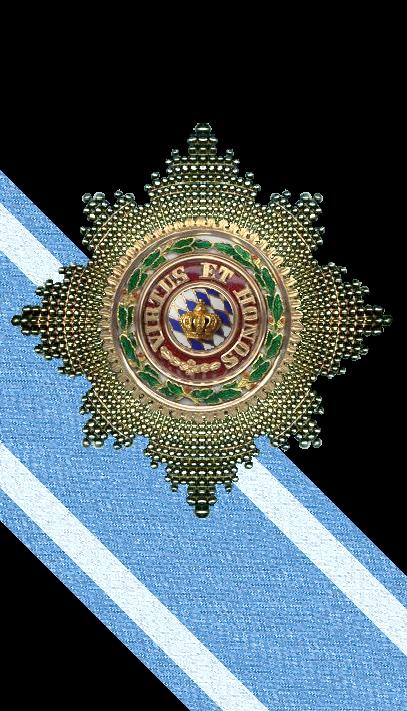
- Star and sash of the order
- Awarded for: Merit deserving the recognition of the state
- Country: (Kingdom of Bavaria) Bavaria
- Presented by: The King of Bavaria
- Eligibility: Civil servants, non-nobles, and foreigners
- Motto: Virtus et honor
- Status: No longer awarded
- Established: 19 March 1808
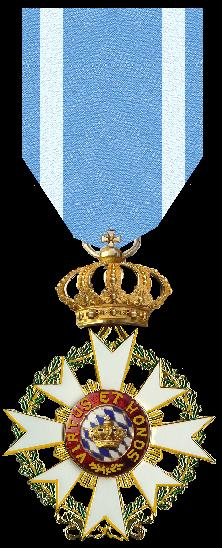
- Badge of a Knight of the order Ribbon of the Order

Precedence
- Next (higher): Military Order of Max Joseph
- Next (lower): Order of St. Michael

The Order of Merit of the Bavarian Crown (German: Verdienstorden der Bayerischen Krone) was an order of merit of the Kingdom of Bavaria established by King Maximilian Joseph I on 19 March 1808. The motto of the order is "Virtus et Honos" ('Courage and Honour').

The order was awarded in several grades:

- Grand Cross
- Grand Commander (grade added in 1855)
- Commander
- Knight
- Medal in Gold
- Medal in Silver

== History ==
King Maximilian I Joseph, founded the order to reward civil servants of the state of all classes and other foreigners who were deserving of recognition of the Kingdom of Bavaria. It was created as a civil counterpart to the Military Order of Max Joseph (Militär-Max-Joseph-Orden). Both the orders brought non-noble recipients in the collection of personal, non-hereditary nobility with the title "Ritter von".

The Order of Merit of the Bavarian crown was initially founded with three grades Grand Cross, Commander, and Knight. King Maximilian II added the grade of Grand Commander in 1855. For each grade there was a fixed number of members. Initially membership in the order was limited to 12 Grand Crosses, 24 Commanders and 100 Knights. Statutes of the order from October 1817 list the limits at 24, 40 and 160. Adjustments to the statutes were also made on 16 February 1824, on 12 October 1834, on 12 January 1835 and in October 1838. The statutes were further modified in 1855 for the addition of the Grand Commander grade, also limited in numbers.

== Recipients ==
- Alfred, 2nd Prince of Montenuovo
- Johann Baptist Ritter von Bar (Königs Hofjägermeister)
- Bernhard von Bülow
- Bruno, Prince of Ysenburg and Büdingen
- Carl Ernst Fürst Fugger von Glött
- Chlodwig, Prince of Hohenlohe-Schillingsfürst
- Frederick, Prince of Hohenzollern
- Josef Ritter von Schmitt
- Gottfried Ritter von Schmitt
- Georg von Hauberrisser
- Heinrich VII, Prince Reuss of Köstritz
- Hermann, Fürst von Pückler-Muskau
- Georg von Hertling
- Heinrich von Heß
- Prince Karl Theodor of Bavaria
- Konstantin of Hohenlohe-Schillingsfürst
- Maximilian Karl Lamoral O'Donnell
- Leopold I of Belgium
- Ludwig I of Bavaria
- Johannes von Miquel
- August Ludwig von Nostitz
- Baron Karl Ludwig von der Pfordten
- Philipp, Prince of Eulenburg
- Rudolf von Seitz
- Albrecht von Roon
- Prince Rudolf of Liechtenstein
- Franz Xaver von Schönwerth
- Otto Graf zu Stolberg-Wernigerode
- Ludwig Freiherr von und zu der Tann-Rathsamhausen
- Johann Nepomuk von Triva
- Illarion Vorontsov-Dashkov
- Harald Nicolai Storm Wergeland
