= Schroer =

Schroer is a surname. Notable people with the surname include:

- Bert Schroer (born 1933), German mathematical physicist
- Nick Schroer, American politician
- Oliver Schroer (1956–2008), Canadian musician

== See also ==
- Schröer
