= Mohr Siebeck =

German academic publisher

- Founded: 1801
- Founder: August Hermann
- Country of origin: Germany
- Headquarters location: Tübingen
- Publication types: Books, journals
- Official website: www.mohrsiebeck.com/en

Mohr Siebeck Verlag is a German academic publisher focused on the humanities and social sciences that is based in Tübingen, Germany. An independent publisher, it has remained in the same family over four generations.

Founded in 1801 in Frankfurt am Main as the Hermann'sche Buchhandlung, the publishing house consisted of a press and retail book trade. In 1805, it became the university bookshop in Heidelberg. Still today, it specializes in the traditional subjects of theology and law but now publishes in a range of fields across the humanities, including ancient studies, Judaic studies, religious studies, history, philosophy, sociology, and economics.

== History ==
=== Frankfurt and Heidelberg ===
On August 1, 1801, August Hermann founded a publisher in Frankfurt, which operated as both a press and a retailer of books. Jacob Christian Benjamin Mohr took over the publishing house in 1804, and one year later, he and Johann Georg Zimmer founded the academic publishing house Mohr & Zimmer, which still contained both a publishing and retail division. In 1811 the Frankfurt branch was closed, and in 1815 Zimmer withdrew as partner, being replaced by Christian Friedrich Winter. In 1822, Mohr parted with Winter and continued the publishing house under the name J.C.B. Mohr. Winter continued business on his own, as Winter University Press.

In 1825, J.C.B. Mohr co-founded the German Publishers and Booksellers Association in Leipzig, serving as its head from 1838 to 1840. After his death, in 1854, the company went to his sons.

=== Intermezzo in Tübingen ===
Since 1816, Tübingen had been home to H. Laupp'sche Buchhandlung, the publishing house of Heinrich Laupp. Coming out of the university bookseller Cotta’sche Verlagsbuchhandlung, it functioned as both a press and retailer of books, as was common at the time. Laupp's son-in-law – the Leipzig bookseller Hermann Siebeck – became partner in 1840 and sole proprietor in 1866. Following Siebeck's death, in 1877, his own son-in-law, J.G. Kötzle, and his son, Paul Siebeck, led the company together. In 1878, they acquired the publisher J.C.B. Mohr, then in Heidelberg, and transferred it to Tübingen.

=== Freiburg im Breisgau ===
In 1880, Paul Siebeck took the operations of J.C.B. Mohr Verlag and some of those from the H. Laupp'schen Buchhandlung to Freiburg im Breisgau, naming the new publishing house "Akademische Buchhandlung von J.C.B. Mohr (Paul Siebeck)." There, the publisher focused its program on liberal theology, the philosophy of Southwest neo-Kantianism, constitutional law, civil law, and "national economics" (first that of the Historical school of economics and then the reformers around Max Weber). Soon afterwards, the publishing house expanded its sphere of influence from the three southwestern universities of University of Freiburg, University of Tübingen, and Heidelberg University into all of Germany. By the turn of the 20th century, it had already expanded with numerous international contacts.

=== Return to Tübingen ===
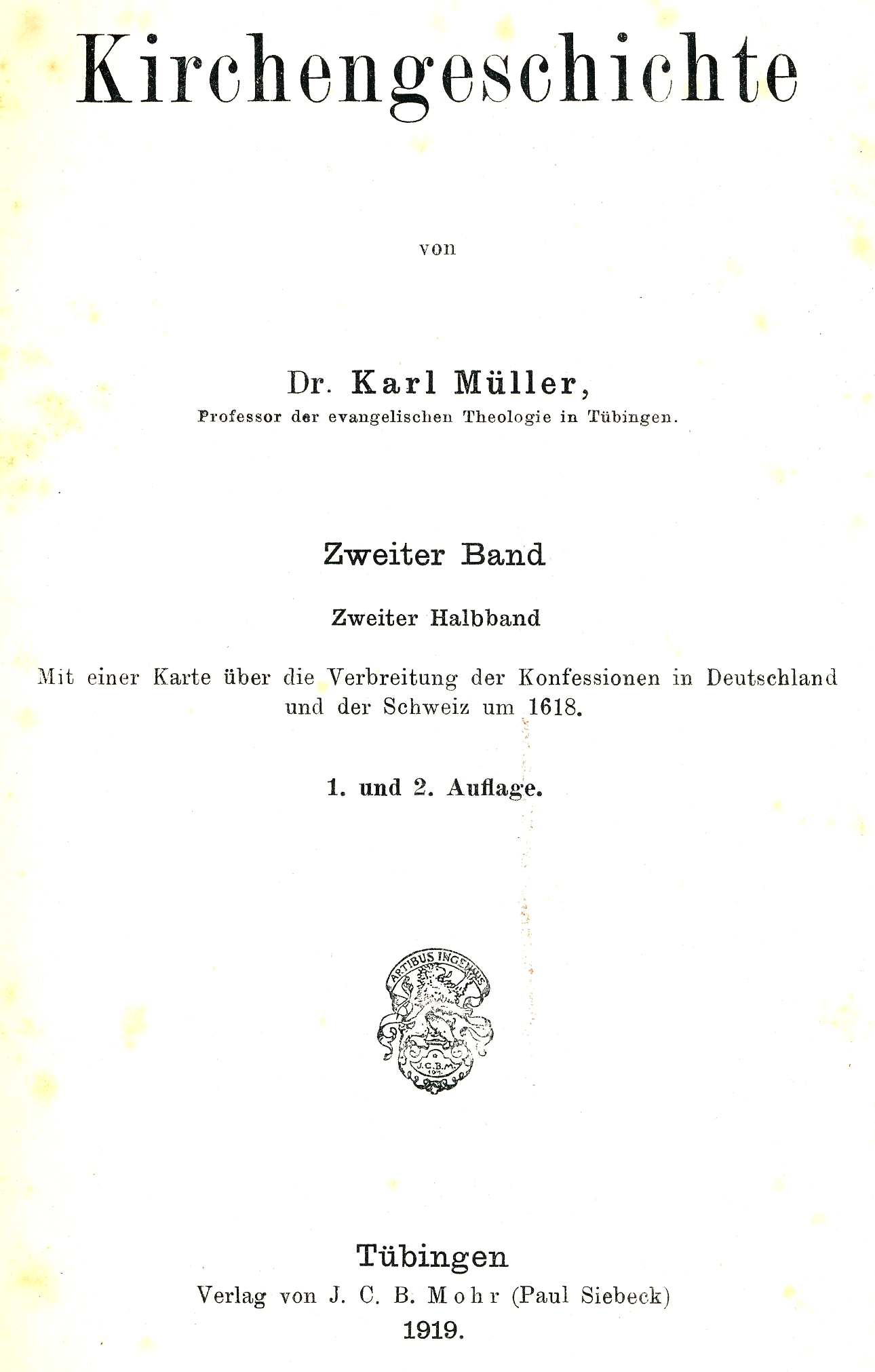
Dr. Karl Müller: Kirchengeschichte, Verlag von J. C. B. Mohr (Paul Siebeck), Tübingen, 1919

In 1899, Paul Siebeck returned to Tübingen with his publishing house, taking over the administration of H. Laupp'schen Buchhandlung and discontinuing the book retail division. His oldest son, Oskar Siebeck, jointed the company in 1906. Upon the sudden death of Paul Siebeck, in 1920, Oskar and his brother, Werner Siebeck, took the helm. In the wake of crisis, caused by a reduction in funding for science and education and by Hyperinflation in the Weimar Republic, the program streamlined, specializing in the four core subjects of theology, philosophy, law, and economics – which remain its focus today.

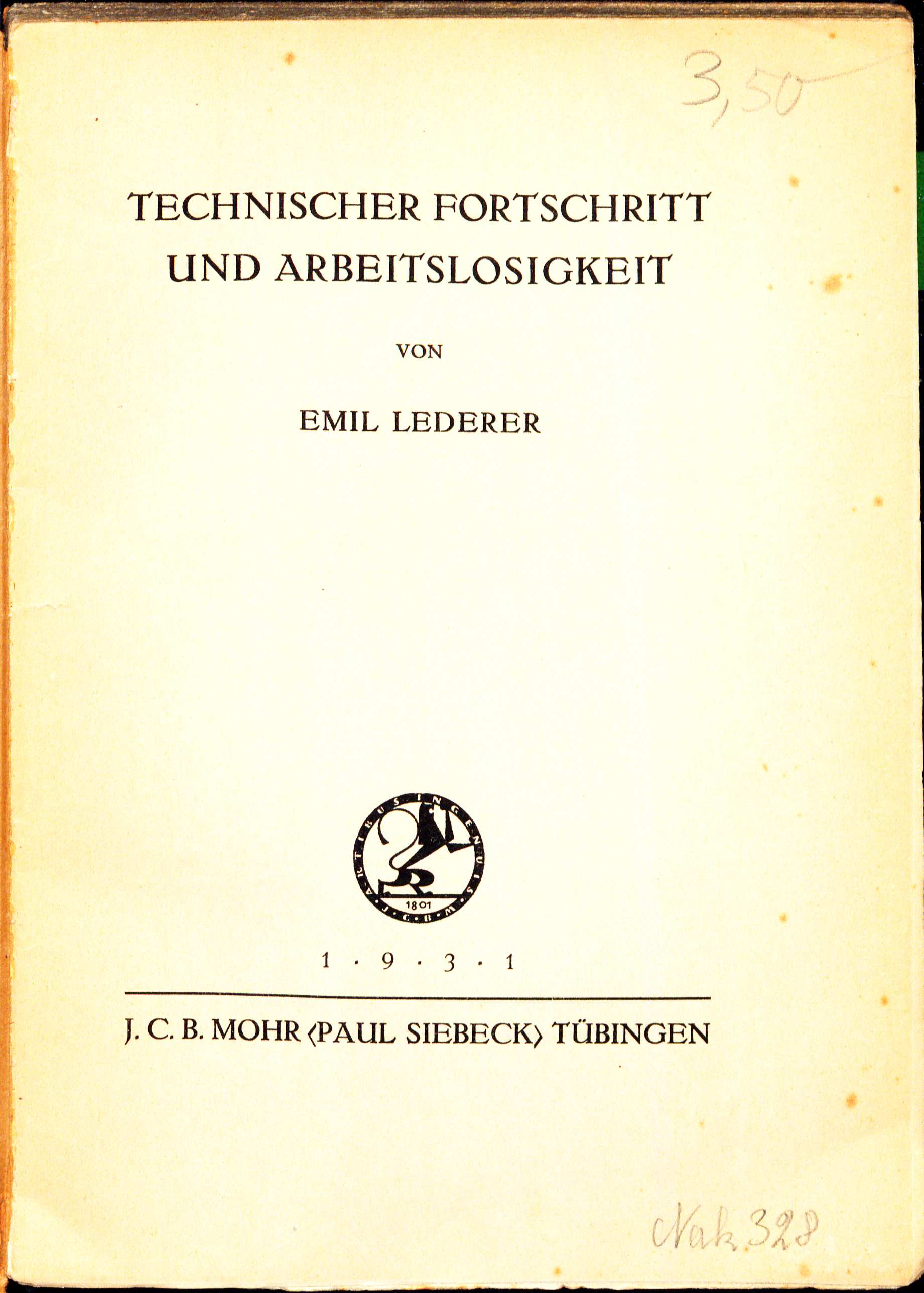
Emil Lederer: Technischer Fortschritt und Arbeitslosigkeit, Verlag von J. C. B. Mohr (Paul Siebeck), Tübingen, 1931

=== 1930–1960s ===
Following the Nazi seizure of power and rise of Nazism, the publishing program of Mohr (Siebeck) – with its numerous Jewish and left-leaning authors – was no longer popular politically, with sales sinking down to one-tenth. When the two brothers died, Oskar Siebeck's son, Hans Georg Siebeck, assumed leadership of the now heavily downsized publisher, in 1936. Between 1939 and 1945, hardly any books were published. In the wake of World War II, however, the publisher received one of the first licenses within the French zone of Allied-occupied Germany and began book production once more. After 12 years of isolation, international relationships had to be established anew. During the 1960s, through its association with the Leo Baeck Institute, Mohr (Siebeck) expanded its publishing program to include Jewish studies. The publisher again became socially acceptable on the international stage.

=== Present ===
In 1972, Georg Siebeck joined the publishing house. Initially, he assumed management alone, but in 2005, Franz Peter-Gillig and Henning Ziebritzki came on board. Since Georg Siebeck withdrew from his management role, at the end of 2014, Peter-Gilig and Ziebritzki have led the publisher. The internationalization of scholarship has also shaped the development of Mohr Siebeck's publishing program: the number of non-German authors has increased exponentially; multilingual book series have emerged; editorial committees now include international scholars; and some journals appear exclusively in English. Furthermore, major projects, like the reference work Religion in Geschichte und Gegenwart have been organized through international cooperation. Since the mid 1980s, Electronic publishing and the internet have assumed a greater role in publication.

The company's archives were given in 2010 to the Staatsbibliothek zu Berlin.

== Major works, important book series, and journals ==
Theology, ancient studies, Jewish studies, religious studies
Major works	Important book series	Journals
Handbuch zum Alten Testament; Handbuch zum Neuen Testament; Religion in Geschichte und Gegenwart; Synopse und Übersetzung des Talmud Yerushalmi; The Dead Sea Scrolls; Johann Joachim Spalding – Kritische Ausgabe; Philipp Jacob Spener – Briefe	Forschungen zum Alten Testament; Beiträge zur historischen Theologie; Hermeneutische Untersuchungen zur Theologie; Religion in Philosophy and Theology; Orientalische Religionen in der Antike; Schriftenreihe wissenschaftlicher Abhandlungen des Leo Baeck Instituts; Scripta Antiquitatis Posterioris ad Ethicam Religionemque pertinentia; Spätmittelalter und Reformation; Studien und Texte zu Antike und Christentum; Texts and Studies in Ancient Judaism; Tria Corda. Jenaer Vorlesungen zu Judentum, Antike und Christentum; Wissenschaftliche Untersuchungen zum Neuen Testament	Early Christianity (EC); Hebrew Bible and Ancient Israel (HeBAI); Jewish Studies Quarterly (JSQ); Philosophy, Theology and the Sciences (PTSc); Religion in the Roman Empire (RRE); Theologische Rundschau (ThR); Zeitschrift für evangelisches Kirchenrecht (ZevKR); Zeitschrift für Theologie und Kirche (ZThK)

Philosophy, sociology, history
Major works	Important book series	Journals
Max Weber – Wirtschaft und Gesellschaft; Hans-Georg Gadamer – Gesammelte Werke; Karl Popper – Gesammelte Werke; Max-Weber-Gesamtausgabe (und ihre Studienausgabe)	Historische Wissensforschung; Texts and Studies in Medieval and Early Modern Judaism; Philosophische Untersuchungen; Internationales Jahrbuch für Hermeneutik	Philosophische Rundschau (PhR)

Law
Major works	Important book series	Journals
GmbH-Großkommentar; Grundgesetz Kommentar; EMRK/GG-Konkordanzkommentar; Entscheidungen des Bundesverfassungsgerichts; Handbuch des Schuldrechts; Hans Kelsen Werke; Historisch-Kritischer Kommentar zum BGB; Kommentar zur ZPO; Hugo Preuß – Gesammelte Schriften	Beiträge zum internationalen und ausländischen Privatrecht; Beiträge zur Rechtsgeschichte des 20. Jahrhunderts; Geistiges Eigentum und Wettbewerbsrecht; Grundlagen der Rechtswissenschaft; Handbuch des Schuldrechts; Jus Ecclesiasticum; Jus Internationale et Europaeum; Jus Privatum; Jus Publicum; Mohr Lehrbuch; Studien zum internationalen und ausländischen Privatrecht; Tübinger Rechtswissenschaftliche Abhandlungen	Archiv für die civilistische Praxis (AcP); Archiv des Völkerrechts (AVR); Archiv des öffentlichen Rechts (AöR); JuristenZeitung (JZ); Rabels Zeitschrift für ausländisches und internationales Privatrecht (RabelsZ); Wissenschaftsrecht (WissR); Zeitschrift für Geistiges Eigentum (ZGE)

Economics
Major works	Important book series	Journals
Friedrich A. von Hayek – Gesammelte Schriften in deutscher Sprache; Mancur Olson; Adam Smith	Beiträge zur Finanzwissenschaft; Conferences on New Political Economy; Einheit der Gesellschaftswissenschaften; Konzepte der Gesellschaftstheorie; Neue ökonomische Grundrisse; Untersuchungen zur Ordnungstheorie und Ordnungspolitik; Wirtschaftswissenschaftliches Seminar Ottobeuren	FinanzArchiv (FA); Journal of Institutional and Theoretical Economics (JITE)
