= Erika Eichenseer =

German writer, poet and storyteller (born 1934)

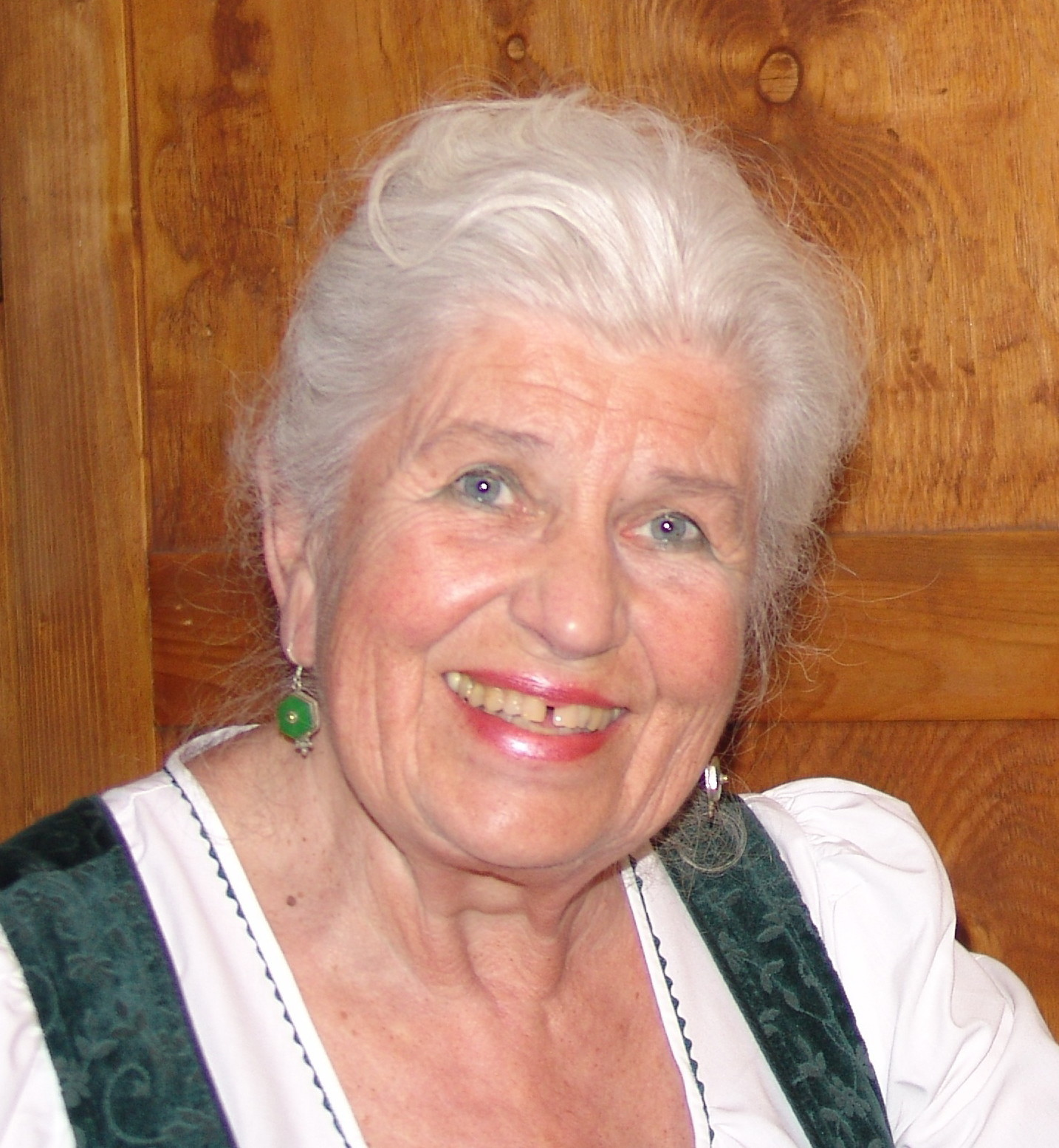
Erika Eichenseer

Erika Eichenseer née Jahn was born in Munich in 1934 and lives in Regensburg, Bavaria. She has led the revival of interest in Franz Xaver von Schönwerth, the 19th-century folklorist who collected fairy tales in the Upper Palatinate region of northern Bavaria, having found 500 tales of his in the municipal archives of Regensburg, most of which had never been published before. She is a writer, a poet, an authority on the folk heritage of the Upper Palatinate, and a well-known storyteller.

== Life ==
Erika Eichenseer completed her schooling in Erding in 1952. She then trained as a primary school teacher, graduated in 1954 at the Teachers’ Training College of Freising. She subsequently studied English and German, graduating in 1959 as a teacher for secondary modern schools. She married Adolf J. Eichenseer the same year. From 1959 to 1979 she taught in secondary schools in Munich and later in Regensburg, where she initiated school theatre projects, for which she wrote plays and adapted local tales, including some by Schönwerth.

From 1979 to 1994, she worked in her husband's institute for the development of traditional culture (Bezirksheimatpflegeamt Oberpfalz), specializing in regional literature, documentation and the reanimation of traditional customs and arts. In this function she guided 400 amateur theatre groups in the region, giving them specialized courses, reviewing the value of their performance material, created opportunities for new plays to be written, and wrote plays herself.

For twenty years, until her retirement in 1994, she produced and directed children's theatrical productions at the instrument-making courses in Pleystein and Waldmünchen. For ten years she was involved in the children's theatre at Burg Wolfsegg, producing texts and directing productions.

In 1976, the Eichenseers were invited to the US to the German Department of the University of Missouri to speak about their work. In 1977 they took part in a university summer programme there on traditional folk instruments. Erika Eichenseer lectured on puppet plays and participated in the German Department's folklore course. In 1995 they took part in the Missouri Big Muddy Folk Festival with lectures and story-telling.

To commemorate the centenary of the death of Franz Xaver von Schönwerth in 1986, Eichenseer produced a booklet of his tales, complete with a teachers’ manual, for all schools in the Upper Palatinate; she helped to arrange a Schönwerth exhibition and a theatrical production which travelled to eight different locations in Bavaria, she opening and introducing each one.

In 2009, she came across around 500 unpublished Schönwerth tales in the Municipal Archive of Regensburg. She selected and edited 136 of them for her book Prinz Rosszwifl (Prince Dungbeetle), which was published the following year.

In 2010, Eichenseer and her husband founded the Franz Xaver von Schönwerth Society. She produced a further Schönwerth reader with a teachers’ manual for all schools in the Upper Palatinate. During the centenary year, the Society organised a whole series of commemorations; Eichenseer herself lectured, spoke and performed at about 100 events.

In March 2012, Eichenseer's book Prinz Rosszwifl was reviewed by Victoria Sussens-Messerer in the English newspaper The Guardian and the discovery of 500 new Schönwerth fairytales hailed as a sensation. This led to considerable international interest. Penguin Classics decided to publish a collection of Schönwerth tales in English – in February 2015 – and translations into other languages may follow.

In 2012, an annual Schönwerth Day was inaugurated at the Open Air Museum in Neusath-Perschen. "Don’t read to us, Grandma – tell us stories!" was the theme of a fairy tale seminar and gala evening. This was followed by story-telling in the International Children's and Young People's Library in Munich.

In June 2013, Eichenseer took part in a 2-day symposium organised by the School of Education in Trinity College Dublin on "The Role of Fairy Tale in Contemporary Theatre".

The premiere of the musical based on Schönwerth's tale Das Fliegende Kästchen (The Flying Trunk) was given on 7 July 2013 in Regensburg. The idea and libretto were by Eichenseer, the music by Mathias Wehr; the work was performed by the Cantemus Choir of Regensburg and conducted by Matthias Schlier, and was directed by Gregor Turecek. It was part of the Schaulust Festival Junges Theater Regensburg.

On 21 September 2014, the Schönwerth Fairy Tale Path, which had been initiated by Erika and Adolf J. Eichenseer, was inaugurated in Sinzing by the Lord Mayor of Regensburg.

== Broadcasts for Bavarian Radio ==
- 01 11 1972: Allerseelen (Feast of All Souls)
- 06 01 1977: Dreikönigssendung (The Three Wise Kings)
- 06 03 1977: Gott kennt keine Grenzen (God knows no frontiers – smuggler stories)
- Easter 1978: Juhe, da Schnee is weg! (Hurrah, the snow has gone!)
- 24 11 1978: Kold is' worn (It has got cold)
- 09 02 1979: An der böhmischn Grenz (On the Bohemian border)
- 15 06 1979: Gott kennt keine Grenzen (God knows no frontiers – smuggler stories)
- 24.12.1979: Da Engl is kumma (The angel has come)
- 03 02 1980: Böhmische Musikanten (Bohemian musicians)
- 08.12.1983: Frauentragen (Women's traditional garb)
- 12 07 1987: Gegrüßt seist du, Königin (Hail, O Queen)
- 23.02.1992: Geliebte, theuerste Therese (Beloved, dearest Therese – 19th century love letters)
- 31.01.2005: Dienstboten an Lichtmess (Servants at Candlemas)
- 15.08.2005: Kräuterweibl und Wurzentrager (The herb woman and herb man)
- 08.05.2007: Muttertag (Mothers’ Day)
- 22.10.2007: Kirchweih (Kermis)

== Regular music and story-telling performances ==
- Since 1985: at the Weiden Literary Festival [Weidener Literaturtage] seminars and gala performances for authors from the Upper Palatinate
- Since 1989: Wöi uns der Schnobl g’wachsn is – Dialect Poetry Readings at the Upper Palatinate Open Air Museum in Neusath-Perschen
- Since 2010: For the Franz Xaver von Schönwerth Society

== Awards ==
- 2004: Hanns-Seidl-Stiftung [Trust] Folk Music Prize
- 2004: Bavarian Forest Association Cultural Prize
- 2005: Bavarian Radio Gold Medal
- 2009: Waldschmidt Prize
- 2016: Upper Palatinate Jura Literary Prize (Literaturpreis des Oberpfälzer Jura)
- 2017: The Anne Izard Storytellers' Choice Award

== Publications ==
Eichenseer has published poetry and essays in the journals Schönere Heimat, Nordgau-Festschrift, Charivari, Literatur in Bayern

- Oberpfälzer Weihnacht: Ein Hausbuch von Kathrein bis Lichtmess, with Adolf J. Eichenseer (Buchverlag der Mittelbayerischen Zeitung, Regensburg 1978, 9th revised edition 1998, 10th edition 2000)
- Advents- und Weihnachtsspiele: Szenen und Texte für 16 Weihnachtsspiele (Buchverlag der Mittelbayerischen Zeitung, Regensburg 1979)
- "Es liegt an uns" in: Ulrich Hommes, Ed, Gespräche auf der Suche nach Sinn (Herder, Freiburg i.Br. 1980, pp. 64–71)
- Das Mundarttheater. Neue Spielstücke aus der Oberpfalz (Buchverlag der Mittelbayerischen Zeitung, Regensburg 1981)
- Die Oberpfalz, with Peter Loeffler and Otto Schmidt (Studio Druck Verlag, Regensburg 1982)
- Oberpfälzer Mundart Lesebuch, with illustrations by Josef Oberberger (Buchverlag der Mittelbayerischen Zeitung, Regensburg 1983, 3rd edition 1997)
- Lorbeerblatt und Zwetschgenkern – Historische Strickmuster, with Erika Grill (Buchverlag der Mittelbayerischen Zeitung, Regensburg 1983, 1995)
- Oberpfälzische Sagen und Märchen. Franz Xaver von Schönwerth zum 100. Todestag. Ein Leseheft. Ed. Commissioned by the District of the Upper Palatinate. Buchverlag der Mittelbayerischen Zeitung, Regensburg 1986.
- Sagen und Märchen aus der Oberpfalz mit Begleitheft für Lehrer (Schulausgabe Buchverlag der Mittelbayerischen Zeitung, Regensburg 1986)
- Beianand mitanand füranand vonanand beianand ausanand gegnanand. Zeitgenössische Mundartdichtung aus der Oberpfalz, text and audio book (recorded at the 3rd Weiden Literary Festival in May 1987, Verlag Dr. Rossek, Herrsching)
- INFO Laientheater (Bayerischer Landesverein für Heimatpflege, München 1991)
- Strickmuster für Mode und Tracht (Rosenheimer Verlagshaus, Rosenheim 1991)
- Steinsiegel. Gedichte und Geschichten aus der Oberpfalz, with Eva Demski (Buch- und Kunstverlag Oberpfalz, Amberg 1993)
- Alte Strickmuster aus der Oberpfalz und dem Egerland, with Erika Grill (Buchverlag der Mittelbayerischen Zeitung, Regensburg 1995)
- Omas Strickgeheimnis: 200 bezaubernde Muster, with Erika Grill, Betta Krön et al. (Rosenheimer Verlagshaus, Rosenheim 2000 and 2008)
- Oberpfälzer Ostern: Hausbuch von Fastnacht bis Pfingsten, with Adolf J. Eichenseer, (Buchverlag der Mittelbayerischen Zeitung, Regensburg 1996, 2001)
- Oberpfälzer Leben: Hausbuch von Fronleichnam bis Martini, with Adolf J. Eichenseer (Morsak Verlag, Grafenau 2008, 2009
- Franz Xaver von Schönwerth zum 200. Geburtstag. Sagen und Märchen aus der Oberpfalz. Mit Begleitheft für Lehrer. (Spintler, Weiden i.d.OberPfalz, 2010)
- Franz Xaver von Schönwerth, Prinz Rosszwifl und andere Märchen Ed. Erika Eichenseer (Dr. Peter Morsbach Verlag, Regensburg 2010) ISBN 978-3-937527-32-1
- Der singende Baum, Story-telling CD; School project: St. Marien-Gymnasiums Regensburg; (Dr. Peter Morsbach Verlag Regensburg, 2013) ISBN 978-3-937527-57-4
- Der Wundervogel, CD with recordings made at the Schönwerth fairy-telling competition prizewinners’ concert. Bavarian Radio Classic (BR Klassik Lautstark Medien 2014)
- Franz Xaver von Schönwerth, The Turnip Princess and Other Newly Discovered Fairy Tales, Ed. Erika Eichenseer; translated and introduced by Maria Tatar (Penguin Classics, New York 2015) ISBN 978-0-14-310742-2
- La principessa Rapa e altre fiabe ritrovate, Ed. Erika Eichenseer; translated by Alessandra Valtieri (Bompiani, Milan 2016)
- Franz Xaver von Schönwerth, Der Klappermichl: Schauermärchen aus Bayern, Ed. Erika Eichenseer, illustrated by Michael Mathias Prechtl (Volk Verlag München, 2017) ISBN 978-3-86222-252-0
- Das fliegende Kästchen. Märchen von Franz Xaver von Schönwerth Narrated by Erika Eichenseer (Volk Verlag München, 2017) ISBN 978-3-862-22231-5 [Audio book]
- Schönwerthove pravljice, Collected and edited by Erika Eichenseer; translated by Tina Strancar, illustrated by Hana Stupica (Miš, Ljubljana 2017)
- Franz Xaver von Schönwerth, Das rote Seidenband. Liebesmärchen aus Bayern Ed. Erika Eichenseer (Volk Verlag München, 2018) ISBN 978-3-862-22269-8
- Franz Xaver von Schönwerth, Der singende Baum. Waldmärchen aus Bayern Ed. Erika Eichenseer, illustrated by Klaus Eberlein (Volk Verlag München, 2019) ISBN 978-3-86222-291-9
- Franz Xaver von Schönwerth, Die goldene Schuppe. Wassermärchen aus Bayern, Ed. Erika Eichenseer, illustrated by Engelbert Süss (Volk Verlag München, 2019) ISBN 978-3-86222-328-2
