= Geheimrat =

Court officials of the Holy Roman Empire

Geheimrat was the title of the highest advising officials at the imperial, royal, or princely courts of the Holy Roman Empire, who jointly formed the Geheimer Rat reporting to the ruler. The term remained in use during subsequent monarchic reigns in German-speaking areas of Europe until the end of the First World War. At its origin the literal meaning of the word in German was 'trusted advisor'; the word geheim (secret) implies that such an advisor could be trusted with the Monarch's secrets (similar to "secretary" in English being linguistically related to "secret"). The English-language equivalent is Privy Councillor.

The office contributing to the state's politics and legislation had its roots in the age of absolutism from the 17th century onward, when a governmental administration by a dependent bureaucracy was established similar to the French Conseil du Roi. A precursor was the Aulic Council (Reichshofrat, lit. 'imperial court council'), a judicial body established by Emperor Maximilian I of Habsburg. In Austria, the professional title of Hofrat (also Hofrath, Court Councillor) has remained in use as an official title for deserved civil servants up to today.

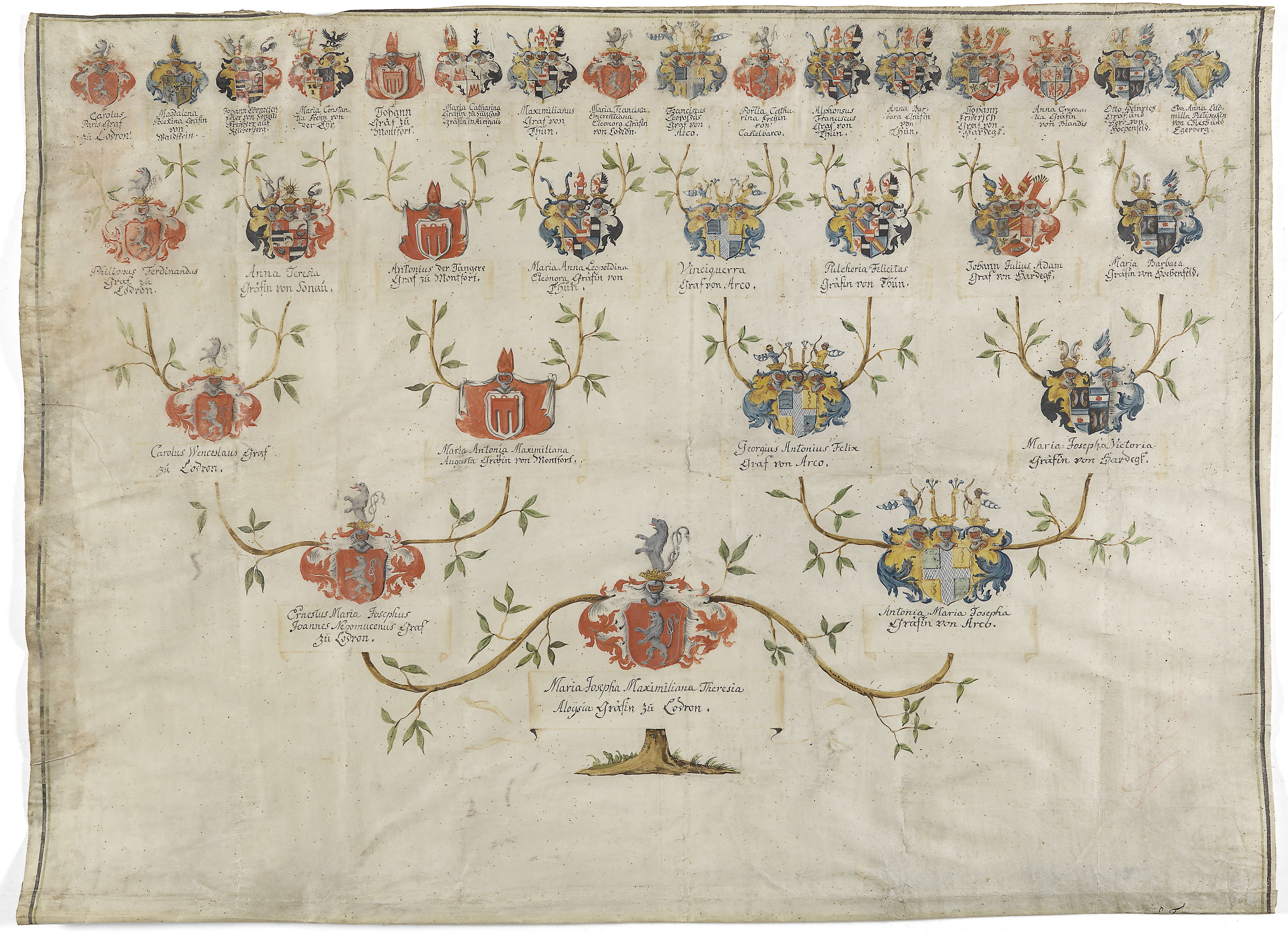
The Seize quartiers on the ahnenreihe of Josepha Maximiliana Lodron (1786)

With the Empire's dissolution and the rise of Constitutionalism in the aftermath of the French Revolution, the office of a Geheimrat became an honorific title conferred by the German states upon high officials, accompanied by the address Exzellenz. During that period related titles no longer affiliated with an office arose, like Geheimer Kommerzienrat, an award for outstanding contributions in the field of commerce and industry, or Geheimer Medizinalrat, an award for outstanding contributions to medicine. The term is also used in combination with the word Ecke 'corners' – Geheimratsecke, colloquially describing male pattern baldness at the 'edges' of the forehead (i.e. the upper 'corners' of the face).

In Austria–Hungary, by 1914, ordinarily, an applicant would need sixteen nobly born antecedents i.e., all great-great grandparents. Though some exceptions were made.

== Post-1919 ==
In the Republic of Austria the title was officially abolished in 1919. In Germany, the title largely disappeared after the fall of the German Empire in 1918, when the various princely states of Germany were replaced by the constituent states of the Weimar Republic, although Geheimräte continued to be appointed by the Free State of Bavaria. However, many honorees continued to use it, and the title Geheimrat, its abbreviation Geh. Rat and related abbreviations (Geh. Med.-Rat, Geh. Ober-Med.-Rat and even Geh. Hofrat) appear in captions until the 1930s, such as used by the German Federal Archives.

== List of notable Geheimräte ==
Born	Died	Name	Title given
1530	1616	Nicholas Remy	in 1575 by Duke Charles III of Lorraine
1609	1680	Raimondo Montecuccoli	in 1660 by Emperor Leopold I
1646	1716	Gottfried Leibniz	in 1678 by Duke John Frederick of Brunswick-Calenberg
1684	1752	Philipp Otto von Grumbkow	in 1710s
1686	1747	Andrey Osterman	in 1721 by Emperor Peter I of Russia
1714	1767	Emerich de Vattel	in 1758 by Elector Frederick Augustus II of Saxony
1720	1786	Mathias Franz Graf von Chorinsky Freiherr von Ledske	in 1778 by Empress regnant Maria Theresa of the Holy Roman Empire
1749	1832	Johann Wolfgang von Goethe	in 1779 by Duke Charles Augustus of Saxe-Weimar
1755	1830	Samuel Thomas von Sömmerring	in 1810 by King Maximilian I Joseph of Bavaria
1777	1855	Carl Friedrich Gauss	
1788	1857	Joseph Freiherr von Eichendorff	in 1841 by King Frederick William IV of Prussia
1793	1864	Friedrich Georg Wilhelm von Struve	in 1856 by Emperor Alexander II of Russia
1805	1896	Johann Gustav Stickel	Charles Frederick, Grand Duke of Saxe-Weimar-Eisenach
1818	1896	Emil du Bois-Reymond	in 1893 by German emperor King Wilhelm II of Prussia
1821	1894	Hermann von Helmholtz	
1831	1897	Heinrich von Stephan	in 1868 by King Wilhelm I of Prussia
1835	1913	Felix Draeseke	in 1906 by King Frederick Augustus III of Saxony
1845	1918	Richard Assmann	by German emperor King Wilhelm II of Prussia
1849	1925	Felix Klein	
1840	1918	Ignaz Bing	
1851	1930	Adolf von Harnack	by German emperor King Wilhelm II of Prussia
1852	1915	Friedrich Loeffler	by German emperor King Wilhelm II of Prussia
1853	1931	Georg von Schanz	in 1914 by King Ludwig III of Bavaria
1854	1917	Emil Adolf von Behring	in 1903 by German emperor King Wilhelm II of Prussia
1854	1915	Paul Ehrlich	in 1911 by German emperor King Wilhelm II of Prussia
1855	1936	Ferdinand Tönnies	in 1917 by German emperor King Wilhelm II of Prussia
1857	1928	Theodor Curtius	in 1895 by German emperor King Wilhelm II of Prussia
1858	1947	Max Planck	by German emperor King Wilhelm II of Prussia
1865	1951	Alfred Hugenberg	by German emperor King Wilhelm II of Prussia
1891	1964	Leo Maximilian Baginski	in 1919 by Prince Albert of Thurn and Taxis
1861	1949	August Bier	by German emperor King Wilhelm II of Prussia
1875	1951	Ferdinand Sauerbruch	
1827	1908	Gottfried von Schmitt	in 1888 by Prince Regent Luitpold of Bavaria
1838	1907	Josef von Schmitt	in 1896 by Prince Regent Luitpold of Bavaria

== See also ==
- Privy Councillor
- Active Privy Councillor
- Active Privy Councillor, 1st class
