= Głuszyca =

Town in Lower Silesian Voivodeship, Poland

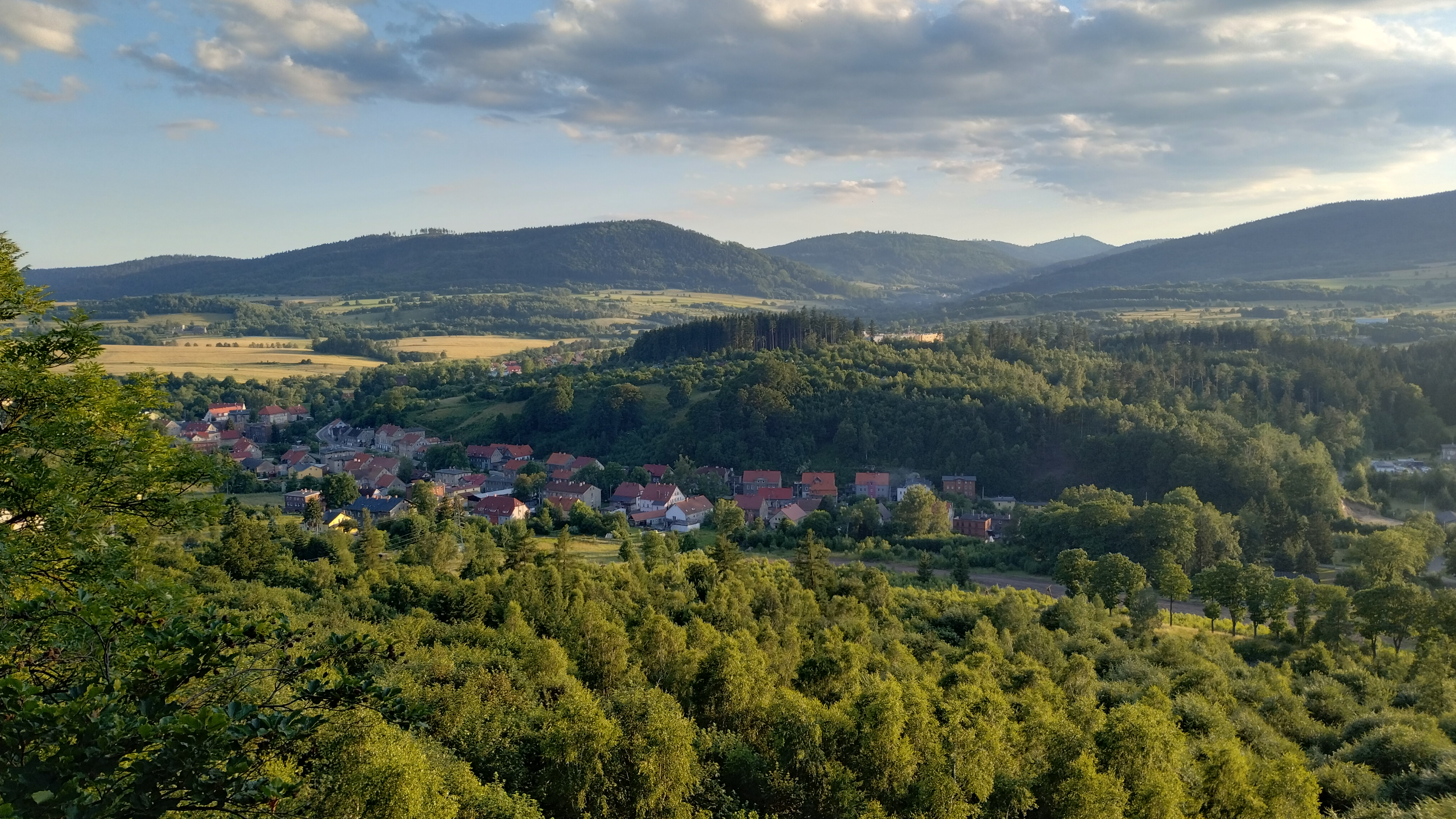

- Coat of arms

- Location within Poland
- Coordinates: 50°41′N 16°22′E
- Country: Poland
- Voivodeship: Lower Silesian
- County: Wałbrzych
- Gmina: Głuszyca
- Town rights: 1962

Government
  - Mayor: Roman Głód

Area
  - Total: 16.21 km^{2} (6.26 sq mi)

Population (2019-06-30)
  - Total: 6,361
  - Density: 392.4/km^{2} (1,016/sq mi)
- Time zone: UTC+1 (CET)
  - Summer (DST): UTC+2 (CEST)
- Postal code: 58-340
- Area code: +48 74
- Vehicle registration: DBA
- Website: https://www.gluszyca.pl

Głuszyca [ɡwuˈʂɨt͡sa] (German: Wüstegiersdorf) is a town in Wałbrzych County, Lower Silesian Voivodeship, in south-western Poland. As of 2019, the town has a population of 6,361. It is located within the historic region of Lower Silesia.

== History ==
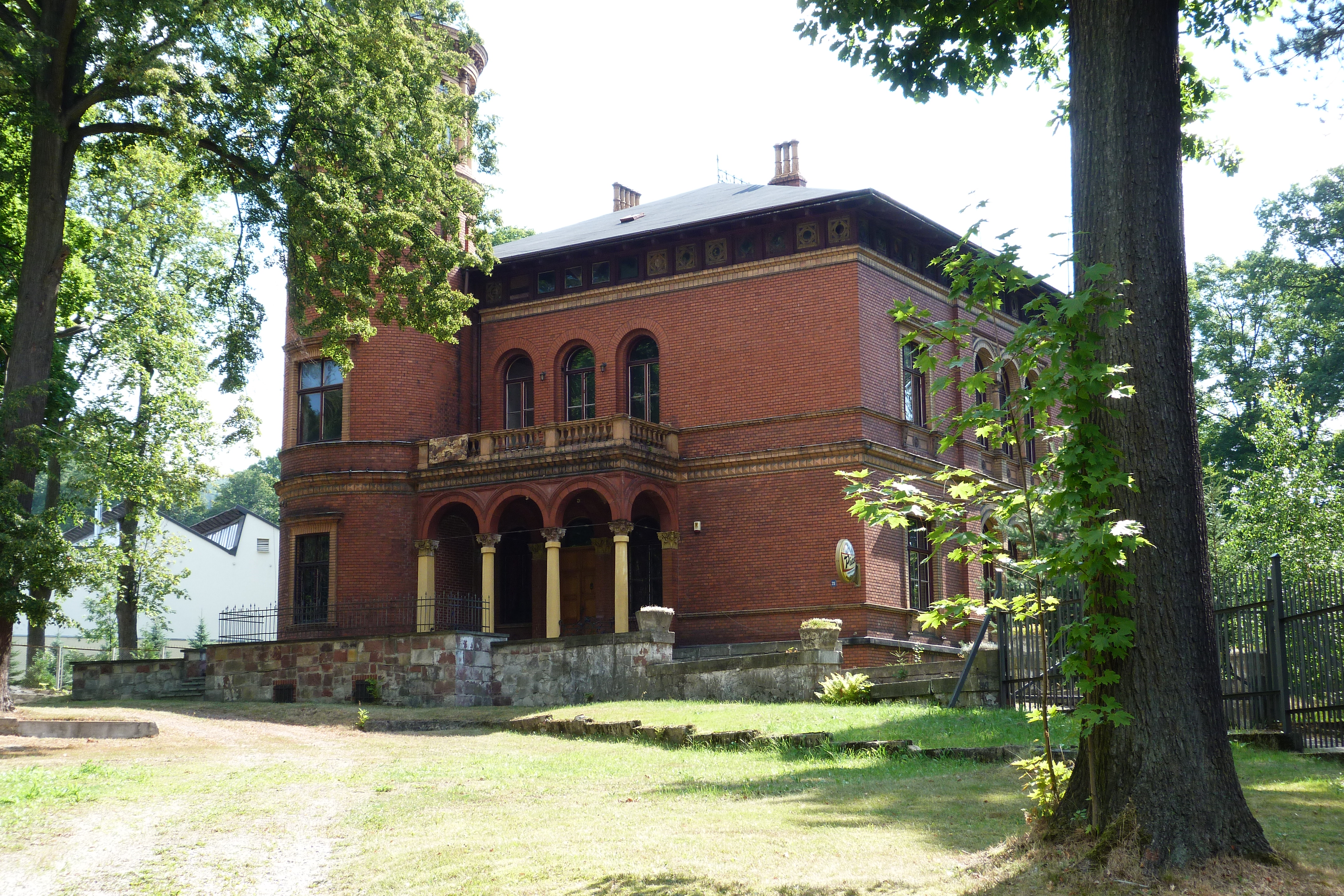
Pałac fabrykanta ("Manufacturer's Palace")

The settlement was mentioned as Wustendorf in the Liber fundationis episcopatus Vratislaviensis from around 1300 as a village owned by the Bishopric of Wrocław, when it was part of Piast-ruled fragmented Poland. It was founded in the late 13th century during the reign of Duke Bolko I the Strict of the Piast dynasty, named Neu-Gerhardisdorf ("Gerhard's new village") as a settlement of German immigrants.

After the town was devastated in the wake of the Hussite Wars, the town was resettled by miners from Saxony. In the 16th century, it passed under Austrian suzerainty, then was annexed by the Kingdom of Prussia in the 18th century. During World War II, the Germans created several forced labour camps in the village, subject to the Gross-Rosen concentration camp. Thousands of people, women and men were imprisoned there. After Germany's defeat in World War II in 1945, the settlement became again part of Poland under the terms of the Potsdam Agreement.

The local textile factories were heavily devastated because of their use by Germany for armaments production. In 1946 production started thanks to specialists from Łódź, and soon Głuszyca became one of the leading centers of the cotton industry in the region. Głuszyca was granted town rights in 1962.

== Transport ==
There is a train station in the town.

== Sports ==
The local football club is Włókniarz Głuszyca. It competes in the lower leagues.

== People ==
- Gustav Schröer (1876-1949), German writer
