= Rabel Journal of Comparative and International Private Law =

German law journal

The Rabel Journal of Comparative and International Private Law (German: Rabels Zeitschrift für ausländisches und internationales Privatrecht) is a quarterly law journal that first appeared in 1927 and is published by Mohr Siebeck. Its subject area is comparative and international private law. The journal is named in honour of its founding editor, Ernst Rabel. The journal is based at the Max Planck Institute for Comparative and International Private Law (Hamburg, Germany).
