= Gustav Schröer =

German writer of Heimat fiction (1876–1949)

- Born: 14 January 1876; Wüstegiersdorf, Kingdom of Prussia, German Empire
- Died: 17 October 1949 (aged 73); Weimar, Thuringia, East Germany
- Occupation: Writer

Gustav Schröer (14 January 1876 – 17 October 1949) was a German writer of Heimat fiction, as well as an editor of journals for youth. His works were noted for their powerful evocation of ordinary rural and town life in Central Germany. Having sworn loyalty to Hitler in 1933 as part of the Gelöbnis treuester Gefolgschaft, several of his works were banned by the Soviet occupation authorities.

== Works by Schröer ==
- Als die Heimat starb
- Alte Glocken neuer Klang (ed.)
- Aus des Lebens buntem Kranze
- Das gerettete Dorf
- Das Herz spricht
- Das Schicksal der Käthe Rotermund
- Das Stärkere
- Das Weihnachtslied
- Das Wirtshaus zur Kapelle
- Der Bauer vom Lehdenhof
- Der Bauernenkel
- Der Brockhof und seine Frauen
- Der Freibauer
- Der fröhliche Balthasar
- Der Heiland vom Binsenhof
- Der Helfer von Lengau
- Der Herrgott und ein Mann
- Der Hof im Ried
- Der Hohlofenbauer
- Der rechte Erbe
- Der Schelm von Bruckau
- Der Schulze von Wolfenhagen
- Der Schuß auf den Teufel
- Der Streiter Gottes
- Deutsche Legenden
- Die Bauern von Siedel
- Die Flucht aus dem Alltag
- Die Flucht von der Murmanbahn
- Die Heimat erobert
- Die Kriegsanleihe der Jungen von Erbesbach
- Die Lawine von St. Thomas. Ein Roman aus den Bergen: Volksverband der Bücherfreunde. Wegweiser-Verlag GmbH, Berlin (1940). 358 p.
- Die Leute aus dem Dreisatale
- Die Pfingstbirke
- Die Siedler vom Heidebrinkhofe
- Die Wiedes
- Drei Tage gesessen
- Ein Barbarenstückchen
- Einer Liebe Weg
- Frau Käthe Werner. Die Geschichte einer tapferen Frau. Quell-Verlag der Evangelischen Gesellschaft, Stuttgart 1928, DNB 362676739.
- Gottwert Ingram und sein Werk
- Gustav Adolf und sein Getreuer
- Heimat wider Heimat: C. Bertelsmann Verlag, Gütersloh 1929
- Ich hatt’ einen Kameraden
- Im Schatten des Helbergs
- Joachim Werner
- Käthe Jüttners Weg ins Glück
- Kinderland
- Kriegsfreiwillige
- Land-Not
- Peter Lorenz
- Scherben am Wege
- Schicksalshände
- Stille Geschichten
- Stille Menschen
- Sturm im Sichdichfür
- Um Mannesehre
- Von Leuten, die ich liebgewann
- Von Leuten, die mir begegneten
- Volk im Schmiedefeuer
- Wenn man auf den Hund kommt
- Wer andern eine Grube gräbt
- Wie das Herz es ihnen eingibt
- Wilhelm Henneckes Hochzeitsreise
- Wir lassen uns nicht unterkriegen
- Wir werfen den Brand (drama)
