= Haig–Simons income =

Law in public finance studies: income as consumption plus change in net worth

Haig–Simons income, Schanz–Haig–Simons income, or Haig-Simons-Hicks income is an income measure used by public finance economists which defines household income as consumption spending plus change in net worth. It is represented by the accounting identity:

Haig-Simons Income = Household consumption spending + Change in household-sector wealth (ΔNet Worth)

The biggest difference between Haig-Simons income and more widely-employed Household or Personal income is the inclusion of accrued household holding or "capital" gains in the Haig-Simons measure. In simplified accounting-identity terms:

Household or Personal income + Accrued nominal holding gains (net of losses) = Haig-Simons income
Haig-Simons income - Consumption spending = Haig-Simons "saving" = Change in household-sector wealth (∆NW)

Much of the discussion surrounding Haig-Simons income revolves around tax policy, but more broadly the measure is fundamental to understanding national-accounting stock and flow measures, and the use of those measures in economic analysis, theory, and modeling. It is especially pertinent to analysis of lifetime incomes and wealth accumulation.

== History ==
The measure of the income tax base equal to the sum of consumption and change in net worth was first advocated by German legal scholar Georg von Schanz. His concept was further developed by the American economists Robert M. Haig and Henry C. Simons in the 1920s and 1930s.

Haig defined personal income as "the money value of the net accretion to one's economic power between two points of time," a formulation that was intended to include the taxpayer's consumption.

That was thought by Simons to be interchangeable with his own formulation:

"Personal income may be defined as "the algebraic sum of (1) the market value of rights exercised in consumption and (2) the change in the value of the store of property rights between the beginning and end of the period in question."

In this concept, all inflows and outflows of resources are considered taxable income in a broad sense, including donations and windfall gains.

== Schanz–Haig–Simons income tax vs. cash-flow consumption tax ==
A cash-flow consumption tax is intended to confine the cash-flow tax burden to an individual's annual consumption and to remove nonconsumption expenses and current savings from the tax base. The base is calculated by combining the year's gross receipts and savings withdrawals, and then subtracting the year's business and investment expenses and the year's additions to savings. Progressive rates are applied to the resulting sum.

By contrast, the base for a theoretically correct Schanz–Haig–Simons (SHS) income tax is each individual's annual consumption plus current additions to savings. Thus current receipts that are otherwise taxable remain in the tax base, even if they are saved, and withdrawals from earlier savings are not currently taxed since they were assessed in a prior year. Stated differently, the SHS tax base has two components—current consumption and current savings (including current appreciation accruing to earlier investments)—whereas a cash-flow consumption tax has only a single component—current consumption.

In spite of their differences, however, both a cash-flow consumption tax and an SHS tax require that dollars paid out as business or investment expenses be eliminated from the base. This is necessary under a cash-flow consumption tax because business and investment expenses are not consumption and it is necessary under an SHS tax because these expenditures are neither consumption nor additions to savings. Since business and investment outlays have no place in the base of either tax, intuition suggests that business and investment interest expenses would be treated identically under a cash-flow consumption tax and an SHS tax. But they are not. The SHS tax and the cash-flow consumption tax take different structural approaches to the treatment of business and investment interest outlays although both systems share the general objective of removing current business and investment costs from the tax base.

== Tax on Haig–Simons income ==
=== Tax on change in wealth ===
The Haig–Simons equation is different from the USA's individual income tax base calculations. For example, any employer contributions to employee health insurance are not included in taxable employee income. Under the Haig–Simons definition of income, such contributions would be included in income. Such contributions might not be included in a Haig–Simons income tax base, however, if their exclusion reflected "an appropriate adjustment in measuring ability to pay."

=== Tax on consumption ===
The European Union and most states in the USA employ a tax on Haig–Simons income with a consumption tax. In the European Union, a value added tax applies to purchases of goods and services on each level of exchange until it reaches the ultimate consumer. In the US, most states tax purchases of goods with a sales tax.

== Criticisms of the definition ==
Some argue that the definition is tautological:

- it is "little more than an accounting identity, a tautology: it tells us only that all income is either spent [consumption] or not [savings], which is obvious enough".

Others observe that it is "only a surrogate utility measure."

Some fault it for neutrality between savings and consumption.

Some scholars resist these criticisms, to the extent they conceive of Haig–Simons as dependent on utility; Simons rejected utility as the basis of the ability-to-pay standard. Indeed, Simons rejected both the notion that humans are "equally efficient pleasure machines," and the idea that taxation can take account of interpersonal utilities. Simons sought a measurable definition for income, but his solution is open to criticism for reifying troubling dichotomies; for example, the Haig–Simons definition depends on the distinction between market and non-market values.

== See also ==
- Flat tax on consumption
