= JuristenZeitung =

German Mohr Siebeck legal magazine

- Editor: Eric Hilgendorf, Matthias Jestaedt, Herbert Roth, Astrid Stadler
- Categories: Legal magazine
- Frequency: Biweekly
- Publisher: Mohr Siebeck Verlag
- Founded: 1951
- Country: Germany
- Based in: Tübingen
- Language: German
- Website: www.juristenzeitung.de
- ISSN: 0022-6882

The JuristenZeitung (JZ) (German: Lawyer's Newspaper) is a German legal magazine. It was founded in 1951 as successor to the Süddeutsche Juristen-Zeitung. It is published fortnightly by Mohr Siebeck and counts as the most important German legal magazine. The headquarters of the magazine is in Tübingen.
