= Robert M. Haig =

American economist

Academic background
- Education: Columbia University
- Doctoral advisor: Edwin Robert Anderson Seligman

Academic work
- Institutions: Columbia University
- Doctoral students: William Vickrey

Robert Murray Haig (1887 – 1953) was an American economist regarded as an expert in public finance and taxation. The concept of Haig–Simons income bears his name.

Haig graduated with a PhD in economics from Columbia University in 1914, with a thesis written under supervision of Edwin Robert Anderson Seligman.
