= Georg von Schanz =

- Born: 12 March 1853; Großbardorf, Lower Franconia
- Died: 19 December 1931 (aged 78); Würzburg, Bavaria
- Education: Ludwig-Maximilians-Universität München
- Scientific career
- Fields: Taxation law
- Workplaces: University of Würzburg

Georg von Schanz (12 March 1853 – 19 December 1931) was a German legal scholar. He originally developed a definition of income, now known as Haig-Simons income.
