= Maria Tatar =

American philologist (b. 1945)

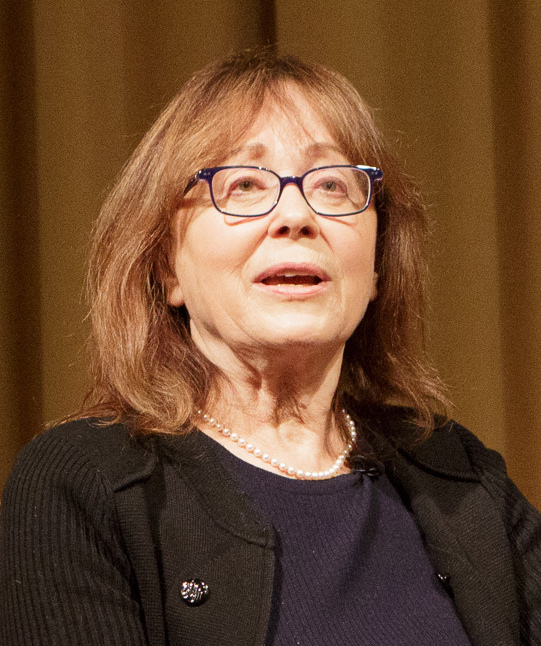
- Maria Tatar in 2018
- Born: May 13, 1945 (age 81); Pressath, Germany
- Citizenship: US (naturalized 1956)
- Known for: Books on mythology and folklore
- Spouse: Stephen A. Schuker (div. 1989)
- Children: Lauren Schuker (daughter); Daniel Schuker (son)

Academic background
- Education: Denison University (B.A. 1967); Princeton University (PhD 1971)

Academic work
- Discipline: Philology
- Sub-discipline: Children's literature; German literature; Folklore
- Institutions: Harvard University

Maria Magdalene Tatar (born May 13, 1945) is an American academic whose expertise lies in children's literature, German literature, and folklore. She is the John L. Loeb Professor of Germanic Languages and Literatures, and Chair of the Committee on Degrees in Folklore and Mythology at Harvard University.

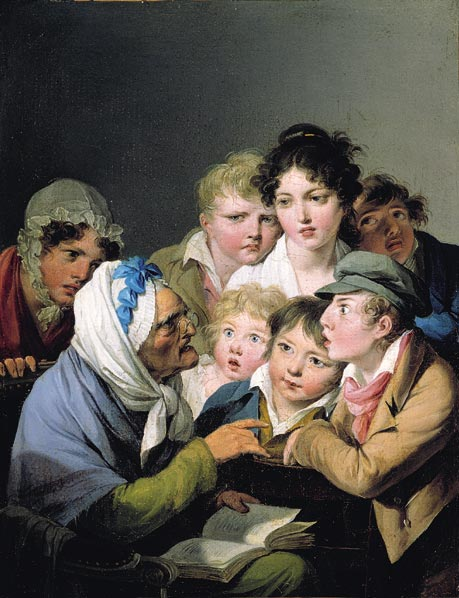
Louis-Léopold Boilly's And the Ogre Ate Him Up!, used in Maria Tatar's Enchanted Hunters: The Power of Stories in Childhood

== Biography ==
Maria Tatar was born in Pressath, Germany. Her family emigrated from Hungary to the United States in the 1950s when she was a child.

She grew up in Highland Park, Illinois and graduated from Highland Park High School in 1963.

Tatar earned a bachelor's degree from Denison University and a doctorate from Princeton University. In 1971, after finishing her doctorate at Princeton University, Tatar joined the faculty of Harvard University, where she received tenure in 1978. She lives in Cambridge, Massachusetts.

== Selected works ==
- "Mesmerism, Madness, and Death in E. T. A. Hoffmann's "Der goldne Topf." Studies in Romanticism, Vol. 14, No. 4 (Fall, 1975), pp. 365–389. ISSN 0039-3762 <http://www.jstor.org/stable/25599984>
- Spellbound: Studies on Mesmerism and Literature (Princeton University Press, 1978) ISBN 978-0-691-06377-5
- The Hard Facts of the Grimms' Fairy Tales (Princeton, 1987) ISBN 978-0-691-06722-3
- Off With Their Heads! Fairy Tales and the Culture of Childhood (Princeton, 1993) ISBN 978-0-691-06943-2
- The Annotated Classic Fairy Tales (W. W. Norton & Company, 2002) ISBN 978-0-393-05163-6
- The Annotated Brothers Grimm (W.W. Norton, 2004) ISBN 0-393-05848-4
- The Annotated Hans Christian Andersen (W.W. Norton, 2008) ISBN 978-0-393-06081-2
- Enchanted Hunters: The Power of Stories in Childhood (W.W. Norton, April 2009) ISBN 978-0-393-06601-2
- "From Bookworms to Enchanted Hunters: Why Children Read" (Journal of Aesthetic Education, Summer 2009, vol.43, no.2, p. 19–36) ISSN 0021-8510
- The Annotated Peter Pan, ed., (W.W. Norton, 2011) ISBN 978-0-393-06600-5
- The Annotated African American Folktales, ed. with Henry Louis Gates Jr., (Liveright-W.W. Norton, 2017), ISBN 0-87140-753-1
- The Fairest of Them All: Snow White and 21 Tales of Mothers and Daughters, (Harvard University Press, 2020) ISBN 978-0-674-238-602
- The Heroine with 1001 Faces (Liveright, 2021), ISBN 978-1-631-49881-7
- Arachnomania: Spiders and the Cultural Work They Do for Us (Princeton University Press, 2026), ISBN 978-0-691-28102-5
