= Karl Julius Schröer =

Austrian linguist and literary critic

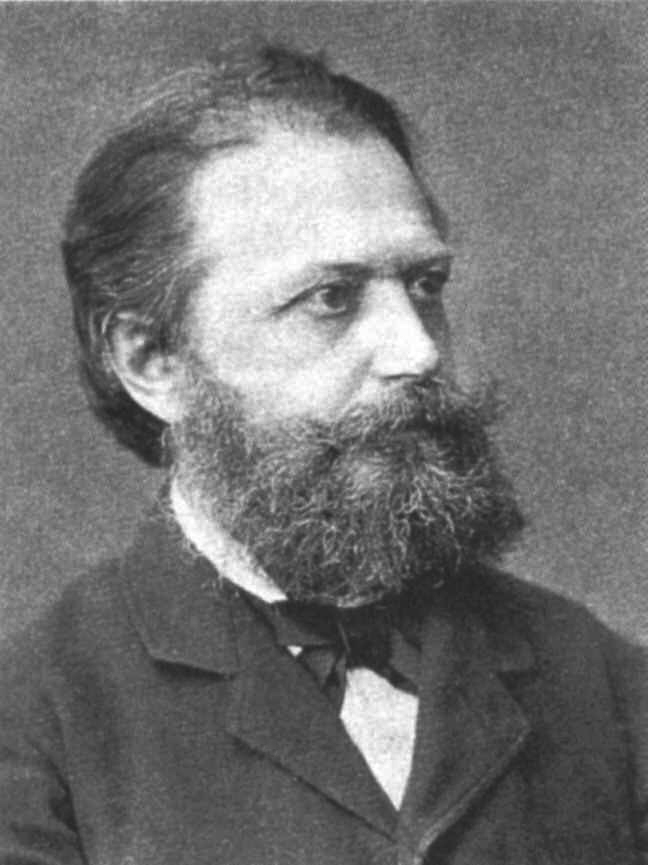
Karl Julius Schröer

Karl Julius Schröer (January 11, 1825 in Pressburg, Kingdom of Hungary, Austrian Empire – December 16, 1900 in Vienna, Austria-Hungary) was an Austrian linguist and literary critic. He was the son of the educator and writer Tobias Gottfried Schröer (1791–1850).

== Life ==
Schröer studied literature and linguistics from 1843 to 1846 in Leipzig, Halle, and Berlin. In 1849 he became a professor of German literature and language in Pest. He returned to Pressburg (Pozsony, today's Bratislava) in 1850 and became a schoolteacher.

Political developments in 1860 forced Schröer to leave Hungary for Vienna. From 1861-1866 he was the director of the Evangelical Lutheran School in Vienna's Karlsplatz district. In 1866, he became a professor of Literary History at the Vienna University of Technology.

In the following years, Schröer researched the folklore of the ethnic Germans, or Danube Swabians, of Hungary. As part of his research, Schröer discovered a medieval cycle of Danube Swabian mystery plays in Oberufer, a village since engulfed by the Bratislava's borough of Főrév (German: Rosenheim, today's Ružinov). Schröer collected manuscripts, made meticulous textual comparisons, and published his findings in the book Deutsche Weihnachtspiele aus Ungarn ("The German Nativity Plays of Hungary") in 1857/1858. Several scholars later extended this work.

In Vienna, Schröer became a major figure in Goethe scholarship. He was a founding member of the Goethe Society of Vienna in 1878 and edited the society's official publication, "Die Chronik", from 1886 to 1894.

Schröer was especially devoted to Faust scholarship, editing the work and providing a commentary in a two-volume edition of that play. In 1884 he published one of his most well-known works, a text dedicated to Goethe's biography, manner of poeticizing, and relation to women: "Goethe und die Liebe" (Goethe and Love). Schröer also edited a six-volume edition of Goethe's dramas. He campaigned for the erection of a Goethe monument in Vienna, which was approved in 1894 with a design by Edmund Hellmann. Schröer died on 16 December 1900, one day after the monument was unveiled.

== Legacy ==
Schröer's student Rudolf Steiner later founded the Waldorf system of education and included the Oberufer plays in a curriculum that still includes them today.

An English translation of the Oberufer Plays, made by Cecil Harwood of The Inklings, was published in 1944 with the title, Christmas Plays from Oberufer. The Paradise Play, The Shepherd's Play, The Three Kings' Play.

In the year 2000, on the hundredth anniversary of Schröer's death, an English edition of Schröer's book "Goethe and Love" (1884) appeared, translated by David W. Wood. *

== Schröer's Edition of Goethe's Faust ==
K. J. Schröer published his edition of Goethe's Faust, parts 1 and 2, in 1881 (Publisher: Verlag Gebr. Henninger, Heilbronn). The full title in German is: "Faust von Goethe. Mit Einleitung und fortlaufender Erklärung, herausgegeben von K. J. Schröer." The two volumes contained detailed introductions and an extensive commentary by Schröer to Goethe's drama, and went through numerous editions. Further editions appeared in the years, Part I: 1886, 1892, 1907, 1926, 1986, 1999; Part II: 1888, 1896, 1903, 1914, 1926, 1986.

== Writings of Schröer online in English translation ==
- Karl Julius Schröer, "The Natural-Scientific Writings of Goethe" (1884): *
- Karl Julius Schröer, "My First Visit to Weimar" (1844) *
