= Ritter (title) =

Title of nobility in German-speaking areas

Ritter (German for "knight") is a designation used as a title of nobility in German-speaking areas. Traditionally it denotes the second-lowest rank within the nobility, standing above "Edler" and below "Freiherr" (Baron). As with most titles and designations within the nobility in German-speaking areas during the medieval era, the rank was hereditary and generally was used with the nobiliary particle of von or zu before a family name.

== History ==
For its historical association with warfare and the landed gentry in the Middle Ages, the title of Ritter can be considered roughly equal to the titles of "Knight", but it is hereditary like the British title of "Baronet". The wife of a Ritter was called a Frau (in this sense "Lady") and not Ritterin.

In heraldry, from the late 18th century, a Ritter was often indicated by the use of a coronet with five points, but not everyone who was a Ritter and displayed arms made use of such a coronet. In the Austrian Empire and in Austria-Hungary, the title of "Ritter von" was bestowed upon citizens who deserved more than the plain "von" but were not considered deserving enough as to be given a barony and designated as "Freiherr". In addition to the described system, Württemberg introduced orders of merit beginning in the late 18th century, which also conferred nobility as "Ritter von" but kept the title limited to the recipient's lifetime (see Military Order of Max Joseph).

== Modern day ==
Even today, members of the Central European Order of St. George, which goes back to Emperor Maximilian and was later reactivated by the Habsburgs after its dissolution by Nazi Germany, are "Ritter" (knights).

== See also ==
- Ridder
