= Statue of Christopher Columbus =

Statue of Christopher Columbus may refer to:

== Statues in the United States ==
=== California ===
- Statue of Christopher Columbus (Chula Vista, California)
- Statue of Christopher Columbus (San Francisco)

=== Colorado ===
- Statue of Christopher Columbus (Denver)

=== Connecticut ===
- Statue of Christopher Columbus (Bridgeport, Connecticut)
- Statue of Christopher Columbus (Hartford, Connecticut)
- Statue of Christopher Columbus (Middletown, Connecticut)
- Statue of Christopher Columbus (New Haven, Connecticut)
- Statue of Christopher Columbus (New London, Connecticut)
- Statue of Christopher Columbus (Norwalk, Connecticut)
- Statue of Christopher Columbus (Waterbury, Connecticut)

=== Delaware ===
- Statue of Christopher Columbus (Wilmington, Delaware)

=== Florida ===
- Statue of Christopher Columbus (Miami)

=== Illinois ===
- Statue of Christopher Columbus (Chicago)

=== Louisiana ===
- Statue of Christopher Columbus (Baton Rouge, Louisiana)

=== Maryland ===
- Statue of Christopher Columbus (Baltimore)

=== Massachusetts ===
- Statue of Christopher Columbus (Beacon Hill, Boston)
- Statue of Christopher Columbus (North End, Boston)
- Statue of Christopher Columbus (Chelsea, Massachusetts)

=== Minnesota ===
- Statue of Christopher Columbus (Saint Paul, Minnesota)

=== Missouri ===
- Statue of Christopher Columbus (St. Louis)

=== New Jersey ===
- Statue of Christopher Columbus (Atlantic City, New Jersey)
- Statue of Christopher Columbus (Camden, New Jersey)
- Statue of Christopher Columbus (Giacomantonio): statues in Hoboken and Jersey City
- Statue of Christopher Columbus (Newark, New Jersey)
- Statue of Christopher Columbus (Trenton, New Jersey)

=== New York ===
- Statue of Christopher Columbus (Blauvelt, New York), formerly in Richmond, Virginia
- Statue of Christopher Columbus (Buffalo, New York)
- Statue of Christopher Columbus (Newburgh, New York)
- Statue of Christopher Columbus (Astoria, Queens), New York City
- Statue of Christopher Columbus (Brooklyn), New York City
- Statue of Christopher Columbus (Central Park), New York City
- Statue of Christopher Columbus (Astoria, Queens), New York City
- Statue of Christopher Columbus (Yonkers, New York)

=== Ohio ===
- Statue of Christopher Columbus (Columbus City Hall), Columbus
- Statue of Christopher Columbus (Columbus State Community College), Columbus
- Statue of Christopher Columbus (Ohio Statehouse), Columbus

=== Pennsylvania ===
- Statue of Christopher Columbus (Philadelphia)
- Statue of Christopher Columbus (Pittsburgh)
- Statue of Christopher Columbus (Wilkes-Barre, Pennsylvania)

=== Rhode Island ===
- Statue of Christopher Columbus (Johnston, Rhode Island), formerly in Providence
- Statue of Christopher Columbus (Newport, Rhode Island)

=== South Carolina ===
- Statue of Christopher Columbus (Columbia, South Carolina)

=== Texas ===
- Statue of Christopher Columbus (Houston)
- Statue of Christopher Columbus (San Antonio)

=== Wisconsin ===
- Statue of Christopher Columbus (Columbus, Wisconsin)

== Statues elsewhere ==
- Statue of Christopher Columbus, Guadalajara, Jalisco, Mexico
- Statue of Christopher Columbus (Lima), Peru
- Statue of Christopher Columbus, London, England

== See also ==
- Bust of Christopher Columbus (disambiguation)
- Columbus Fountain
- Columbus Monument (disambiguation)
- List of monuments and memorials to Christopher Columbus
- Monument to Christopher Columbus (disambiguation)
