= Statue of Christopher Columbus, Guadalajara =

Statue in Guadalajara, Jalisco, Mexico

Statue of Christopher Columbus
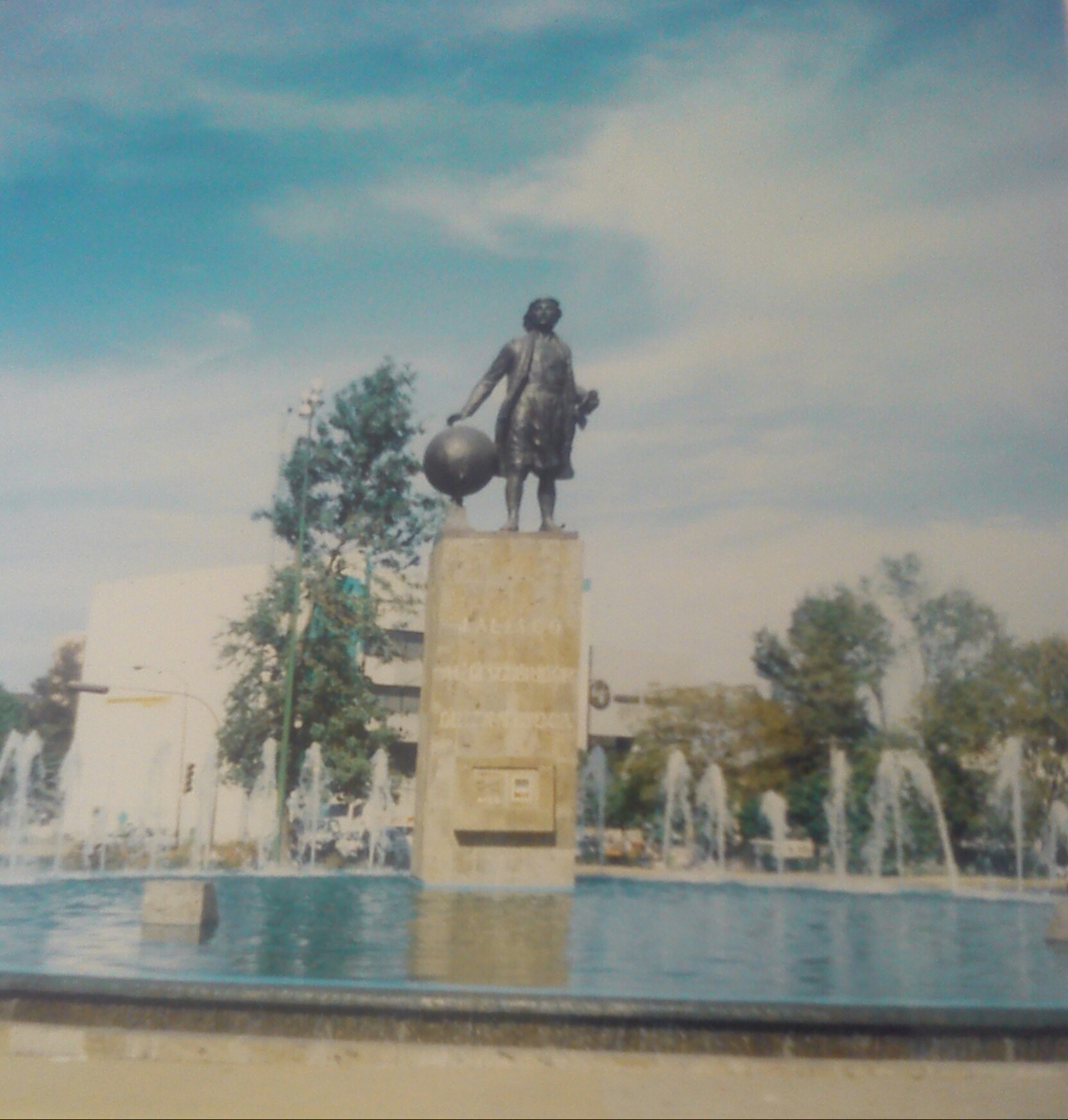
- The old statue of Christopher Columbus in 2017. The monument at Columbus Roundabout features a replica.
- Subject: Christopher Columbus
- Location: Guadalajara, Jalisco, Mexico; 20°41′44.5″N 103°22′23.62″W

A statue of Christopher Columbus is installed along Columbus Roundabout, in Guadalajara, in the Mexican state of Jalisco.

== Description ==
The statue is supported by a large column. It formerly had a plaque that said "The discoverer of America".

== Reception ==
Around 2008, the statue received unfavorable comments by indigenous groups as it is located in a zone where the statues of several American liberators are located.

== See also ==
- List of monuments and memorials to Christopher Columbus
