= Christopher Columbus Museum =

Museum in Castile and León, Spain

Coordinates: 41°39′12″N 4°43′05″W

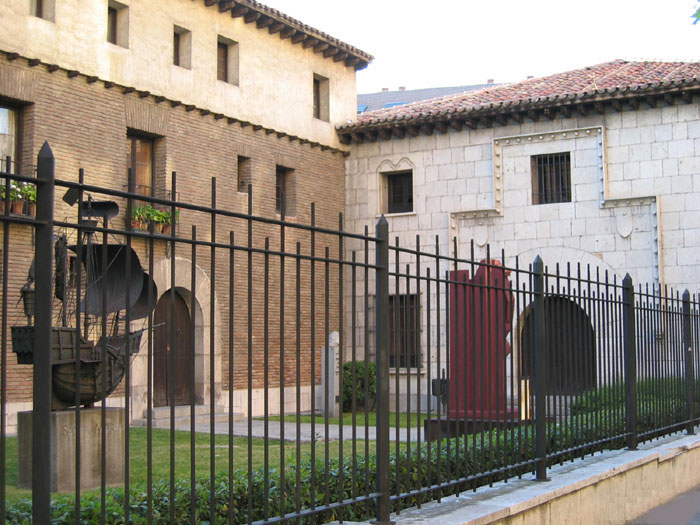
Casa Museo de Colon

Christopher Columbus Museum is a museum in Valladolid in western Spain built in 1968. Outside is a statue of the Santa María.

== The Building ==
Although popular tradition places the last residence of Christopher Columbus, who died in Valladolid on May 20, 1506, in the vicinity of the current building, it is known that it was in the now-demolished Convent of San Francisco located between Santiago Street and the Plaza Mayor where the discoverer died, so the existence of the Columbus House in Valladolid does not respond to strictly historical criteria.

This old house disappeared due to urban development in the area, but the initiative of a group of intellectuals and university students prompted the Valladolid City Council to undertake the purchase of a plot of land and build a museum to commemorate the figure of the admiral. This new building was partially inspired by a palatial house owned by Diego Columbus, Christopher Columbus's eldest son, which he acquired as his family residence in 1509 on the island of Santo Domingo. It was built in the Isabelline Gothic style with a corner window. The façade, meanwhile, incorporates the doorway from the Valladolid house of Pedro de Arrieta, a notary of the Royal Chancery of Valladolid, and his wife, Agustina de Garibay.

== Gallery ==
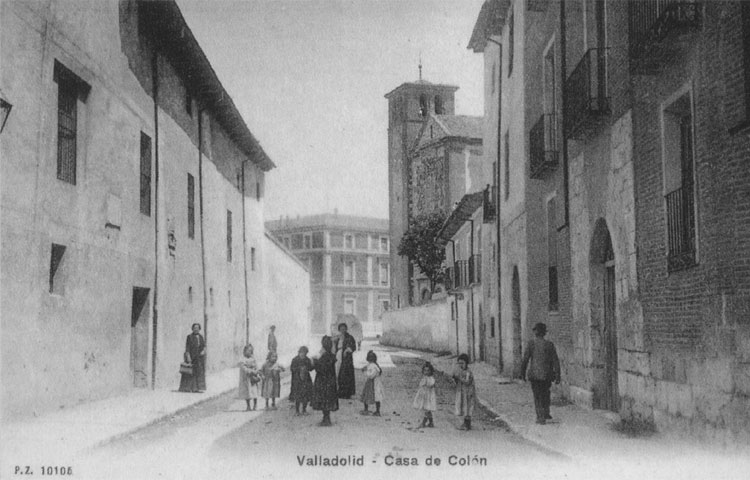
Old photo of the building

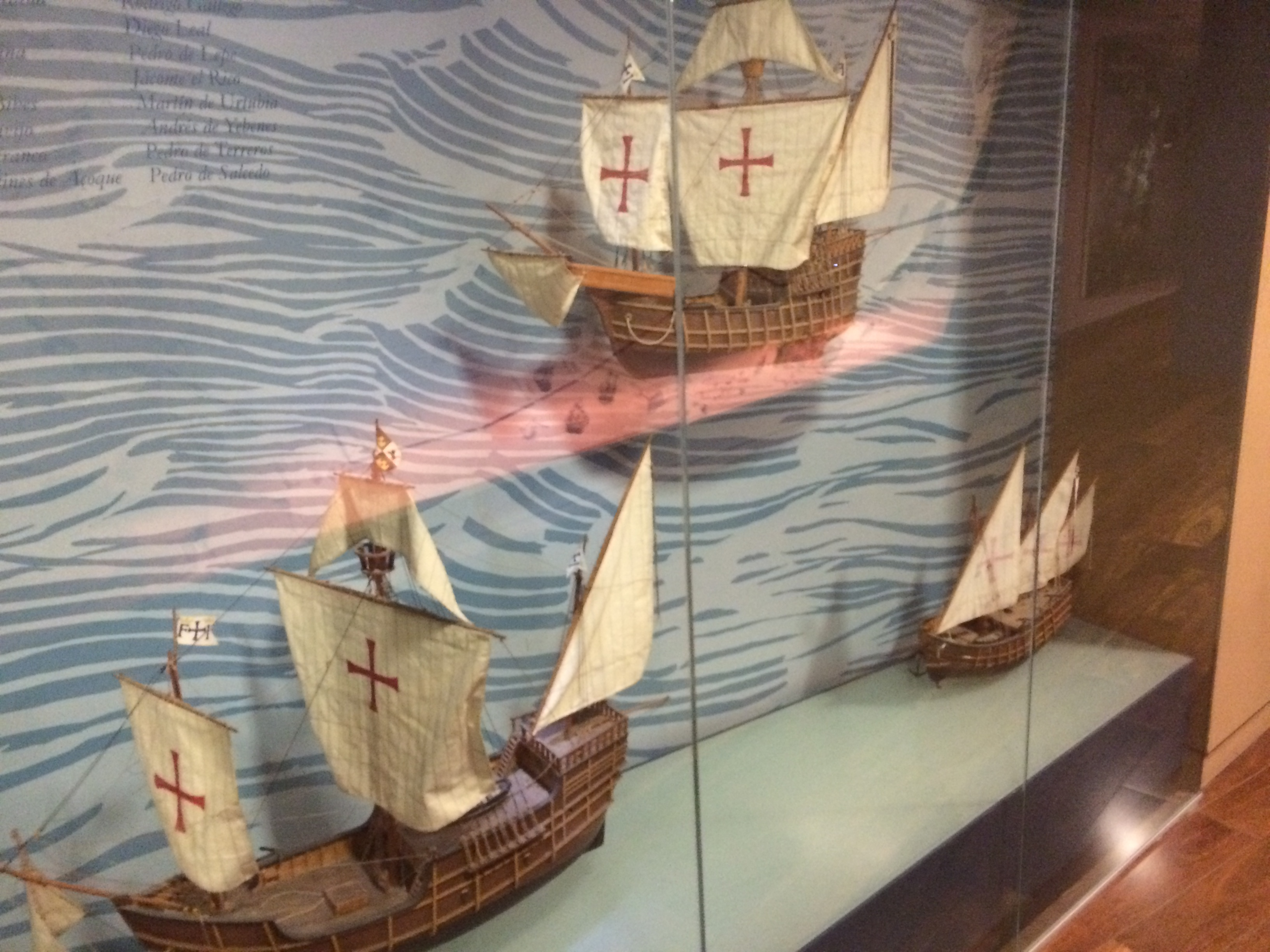

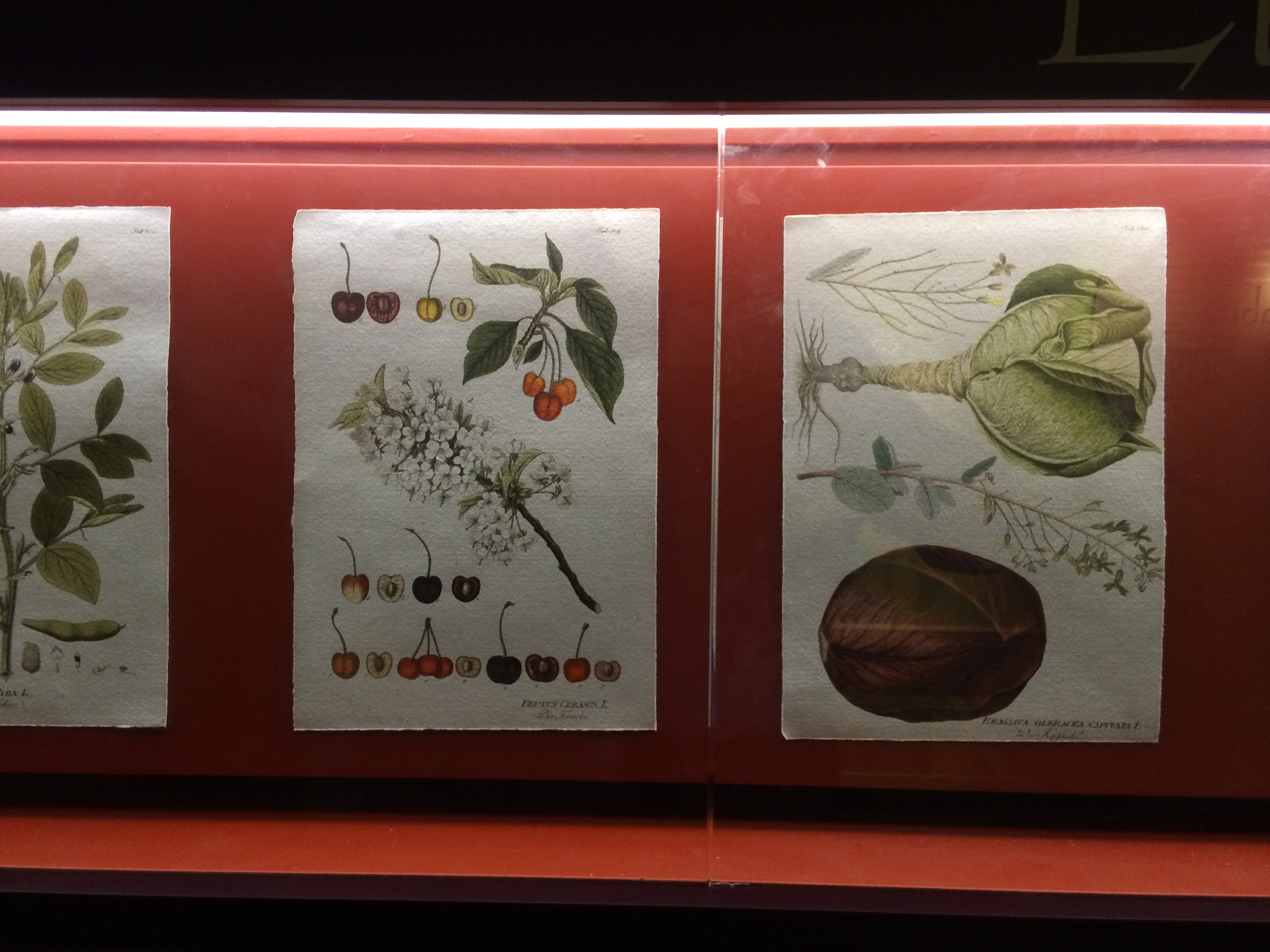

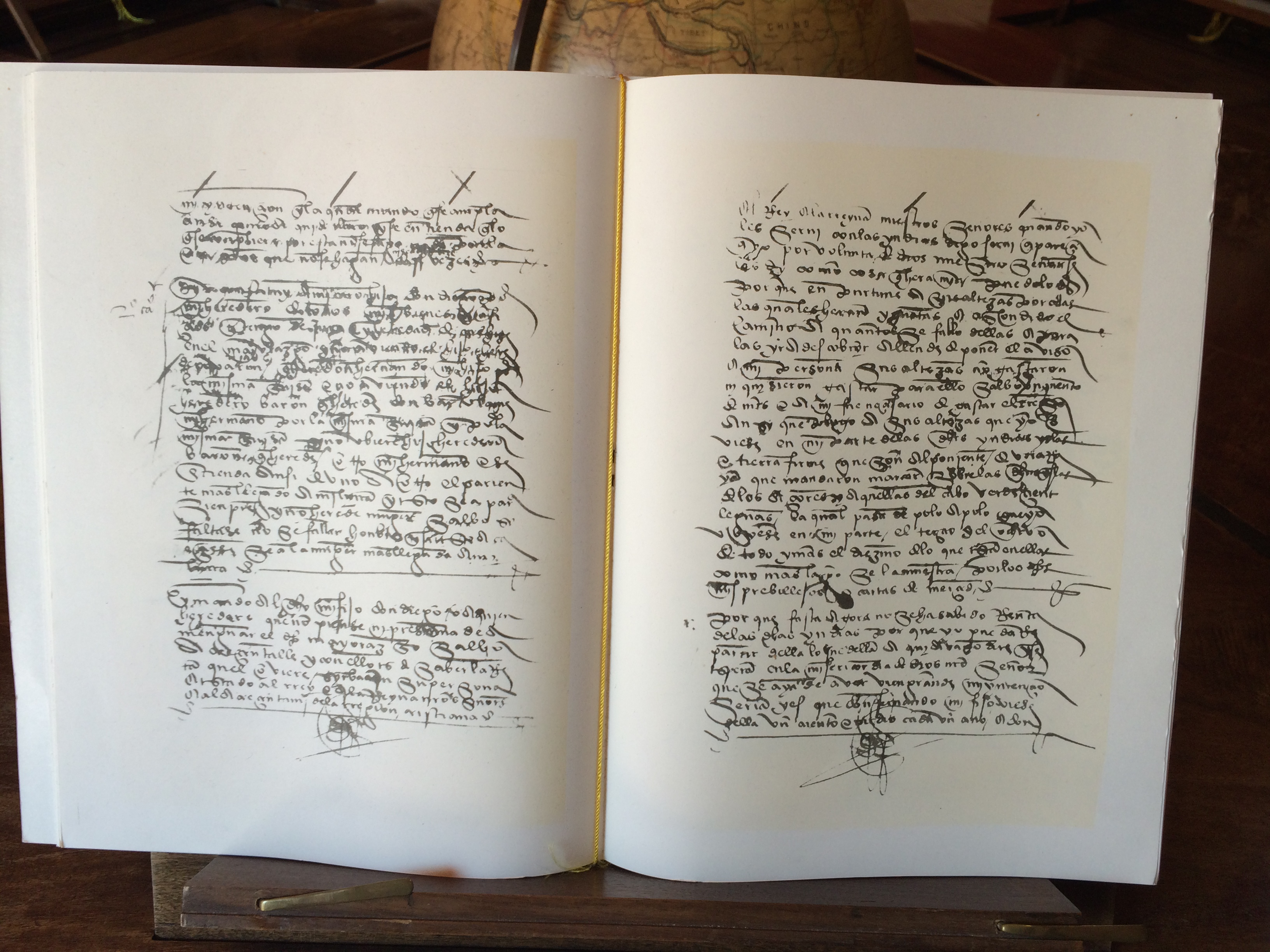

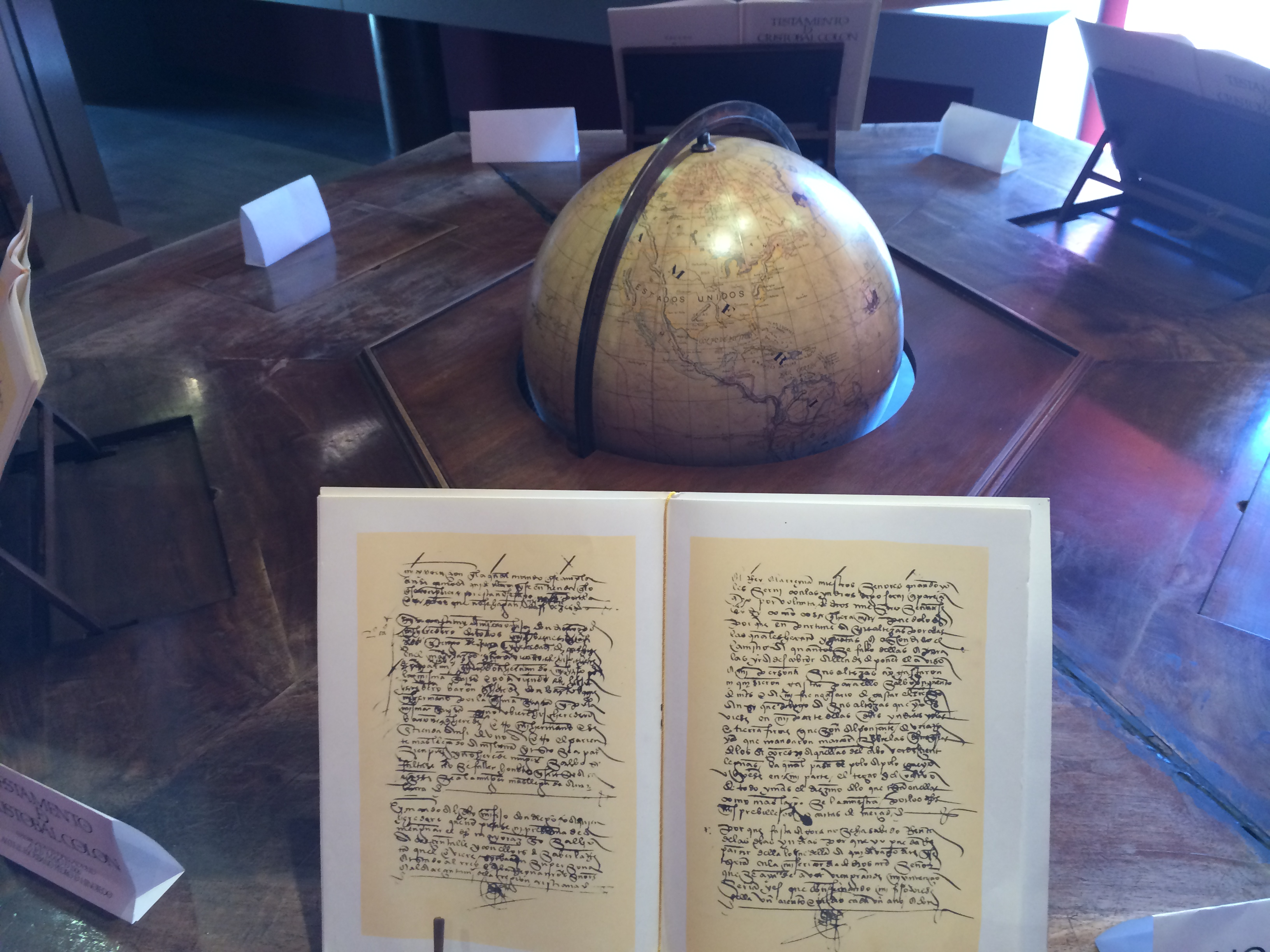

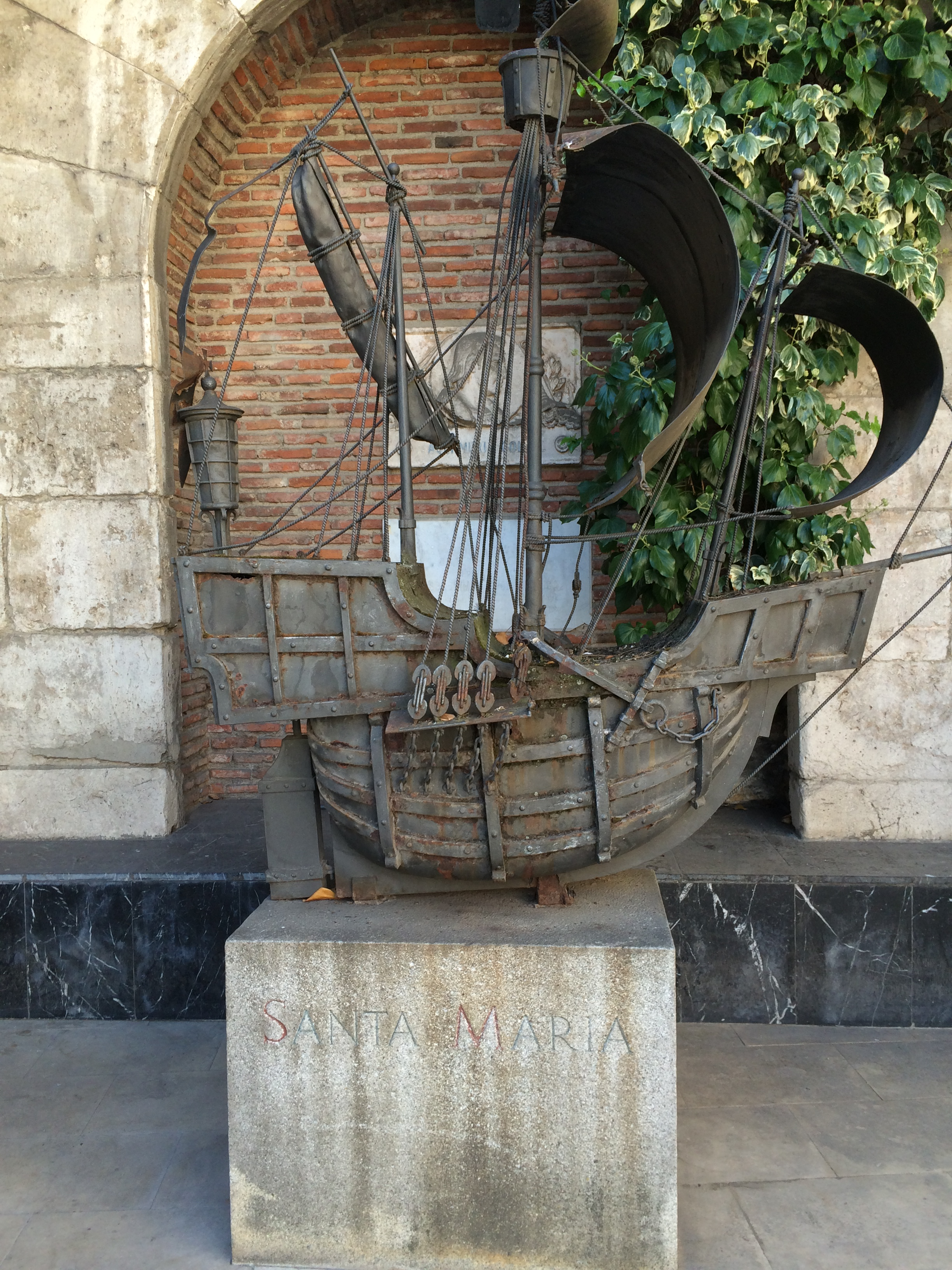

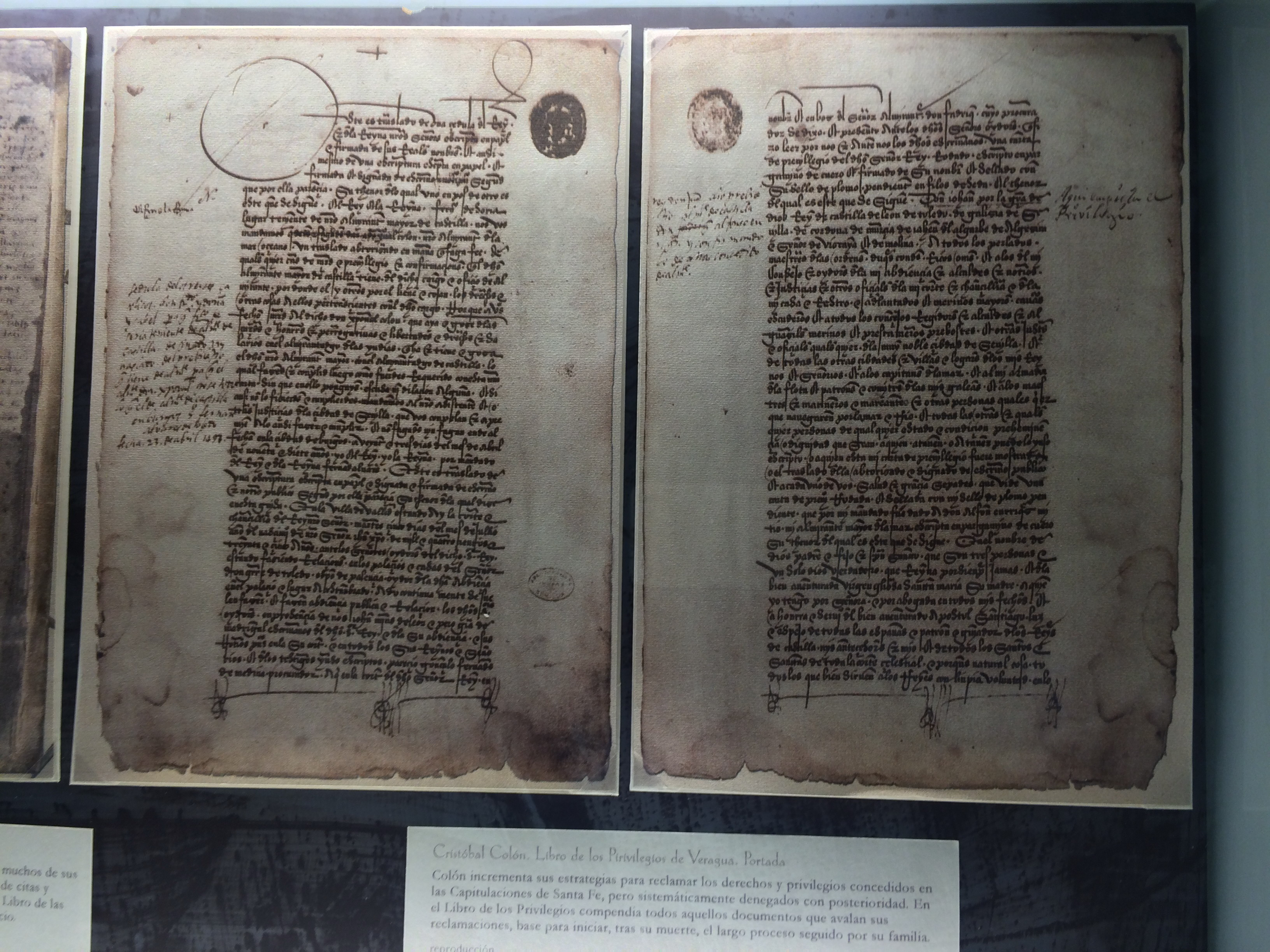

== See also ==
- List of monuments and memorials to Christopher Columbus
