= Columbus Monument (Buyens) =

Statue of Columbus in Massachusetts, U.S.

Coordinates: 42°25′06″N 71°00′03″W

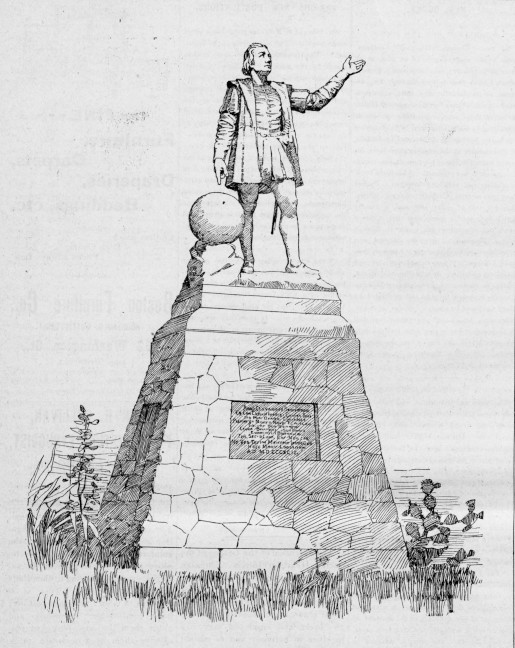
- Design for Buyens's Christopher Columbus Monument, published in the Sacred Heart Review on July 2, 1892.
- Artist: Alois G. Buyens
- Completion date: October 12, 1892
- Medium: Bronze
- Dimensions: Base: approx. 100 x 70 x 59 in.

The Columbus Monument is a monument by the sculptor Alois G. Buyens depicting Christopher Columbus, commissioned by members of the Boston-area Catholic community in 1892. It is one of the first statues that the Belgian-born Buyens created after coming to America in 1892 and opening a studio in Boston. The monument was to be installed at La Isabella to mark the site of the first Catholic Church in the Americas. A copy of the monument was installed in Boston. The Boston version was moved several times, and it is now located in front of the Saint Anthony of Padua Church in Revere, Massachusetts.

== History and funding ==
Throughout the nineteenth century, Columbus was rising in importance in the Catholic American community's self-understanding as immigrants to the United States. According to The Sacred Heart Review, a prominent New England publication for the Catholic community, it was considered "proper to speak of the celebration of Columbus Day in Boston as a Catholic demonstration."

In September 1891, Thomas H. Cummings suggested to The Sacred Heart Review to erect a monument to Columbus at La Isabela, his first settlement in Santo Domingo to commemorate the beginning of the Christian civilization in America. The Sacred Heart Review suggested to erect a replica in a public space in Boston. In September 1892, the City Council of Boston agreed to dedicate a duplicate of the La Isabela statue for the fourth centennial year of Columbus's arrival in America. The sculpture was commissioned by the Knights of Columbus.

== Design and construction ==
The design was primarily the creation of Richard Andrew, a student at the Massachusetts College of Art and Design (called State Normal Art School at the time). Alois G. Buyens was selected as the sculptor in order to contribute what the Sacred Heart Review described as the "bold and vigorous treatment of the Flemish School, of which Mr. Buyens is a disciple."

Ames Manufacturing Company of Chicopee cast the statue in bronze.

== Site and dedication ==
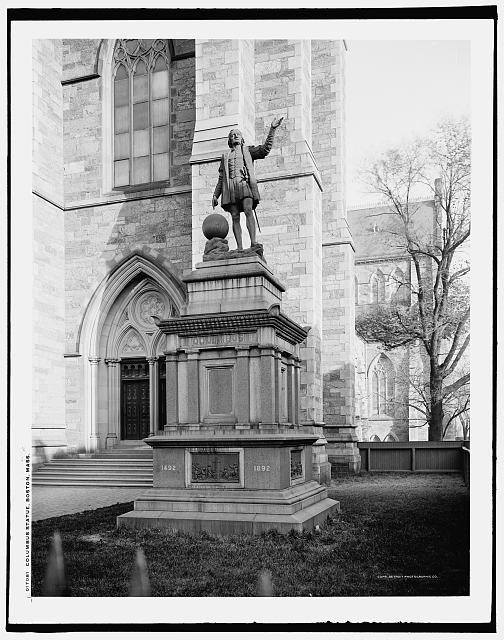
The monument in its original location at the Cathedral of the Holy Cross, circa 1904.

Copley Square was first chosen as the location for the statue. However, after an exhibition of the model, its design was heavily criticized by the State Arts Commission. The Commission rejected the plan to place the statue at Copley Square, leading the monument's organizers to select the Cathedral of the Holy Cross in the South End, the first church built for Boston's Roman Catholics, as an alternate location. The Boston Advertiser provided a detailed account of the monument's supposed flaws at the time:

The execution is commonplace. The faults of the statue are lack of fine sentiment, of movement or beauty of form. It would seem as if the artist had conceived Columbus as a man of piety, but puts the fact that he achieved something affecting the geography of the world before the spectator as boldly as a schoolboy who points at his globe, just barely missing the labels as infantile artistic efforts.

The statue was dedicated on October 21 in front of the Cathedral of the Holy Cross. The ceremony took place for Columbus Day with a parade, followed by a procession where Captain Nathan Appleton revealed that the Governor of Massachusetts, the Mayor of the city of Boston, the Italian Consul, and the Collector of the Port of Boston had all appointed a committee to erect a statue to Columbus in the Public Garden but the project was never carried out because of a lack of funds. The Sacred Heart Review praised the Buyens statue for being accomplished despite "the united energies of all those functionaries."

In the 1920s, the statue was discretely relocated to St. Anthony's Church in Revere to equally balance a statue of St. Anthony standing on the opposite side of the church. Marty Carlock wrote in A Guide to Public Art in Greater Boston that the "huge statue overpowered its site" at the Cathedral of the Holy Cross.

== See also ==
- List of monuments and memorials to Christopher Columbus
