= Statue of Christopher Columbus (Wilkes-Barre, Pennsylvania) =

Sculpture in Wilkes-Barre, Pennsylvania, U.S.

- Subject: Christopher Columbus
- Location: Wilkes-Barre, Pennsylvania; 41.24564°N 75.88226°W

A statue of Christopher Columbus is installed in Wilkes-Barre, Pennsylvania, United States. The monument was vandalized multiple times in 2020.

== See also ==
- List of monuments and memorials to Christopher Columbus
