= Bust of Christopher Columbus (Detroit) =

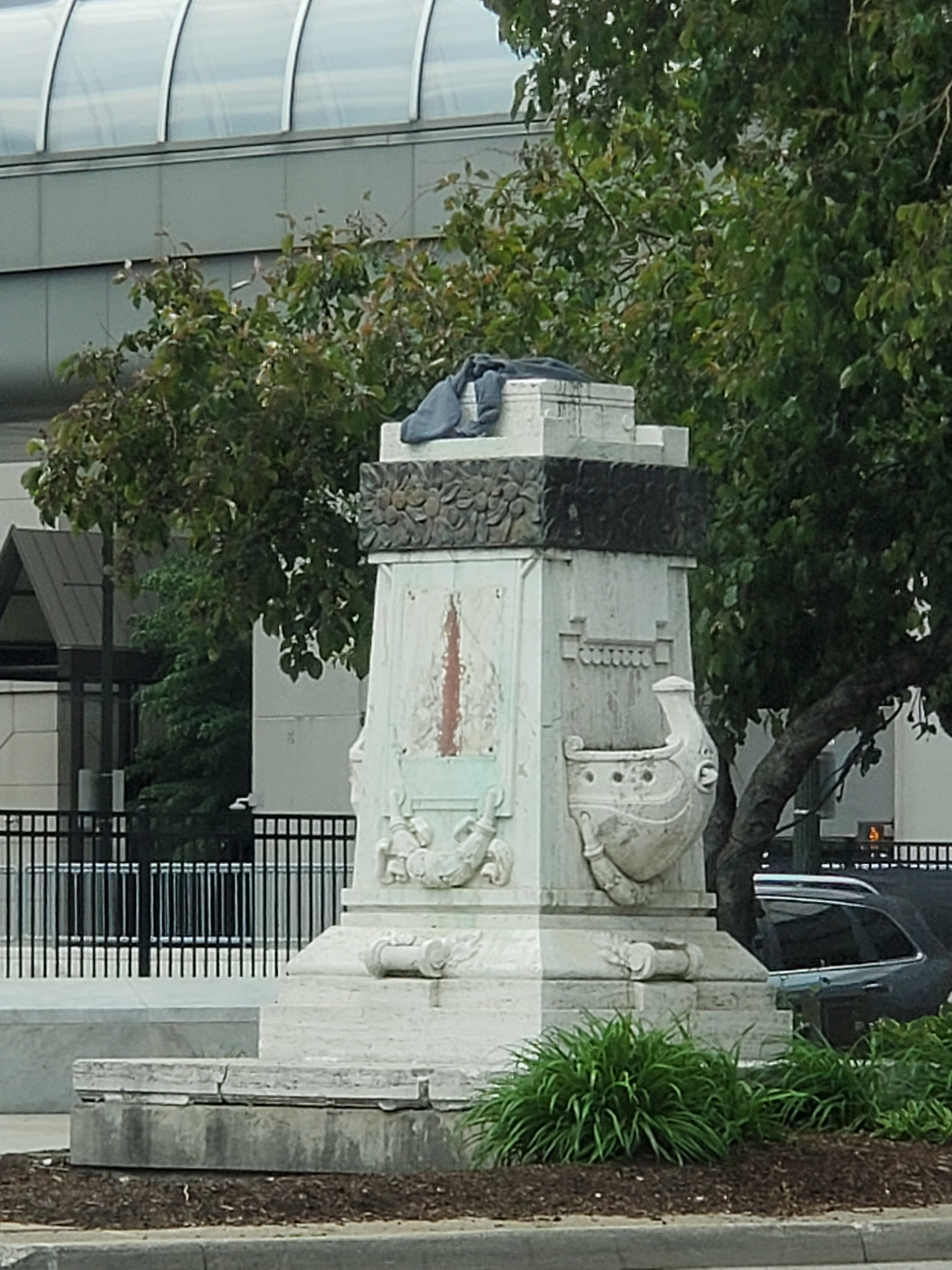
- The pedestal in 2022, following the bust's removal
- Location: Detroit, Michigan, United States
- Type: Bust
- Dedicated to: Christopher Columbus

A bust of Christopher Columbus was installed in Detroit, Michigan, United States. The memorial was removed in June 2020.

== See also ==
- List of monuments and memorials to Christopher Columbus
- List of monuments and memorials removed during the George Floyd protests
