= Statue of Christopher Columbus (San Antonio) =

- Subject: Christopher Columbus
- Location: San Antonio, Texas, U.S.; 29.42994°N 98.49905°W

A statue of Christopher Columbus was installed in San Antonio, Texas, United States.

== History ==
The statue was removed in 2020.

== See also ==
- List of monuments and memorials to Christopher Columbus
- List of monuments and memorials removed during the George Floyd protests
