= Bust of Christopher Columbus (Lancaster, Pennsylvania) =

Bust of Christopher Columbus

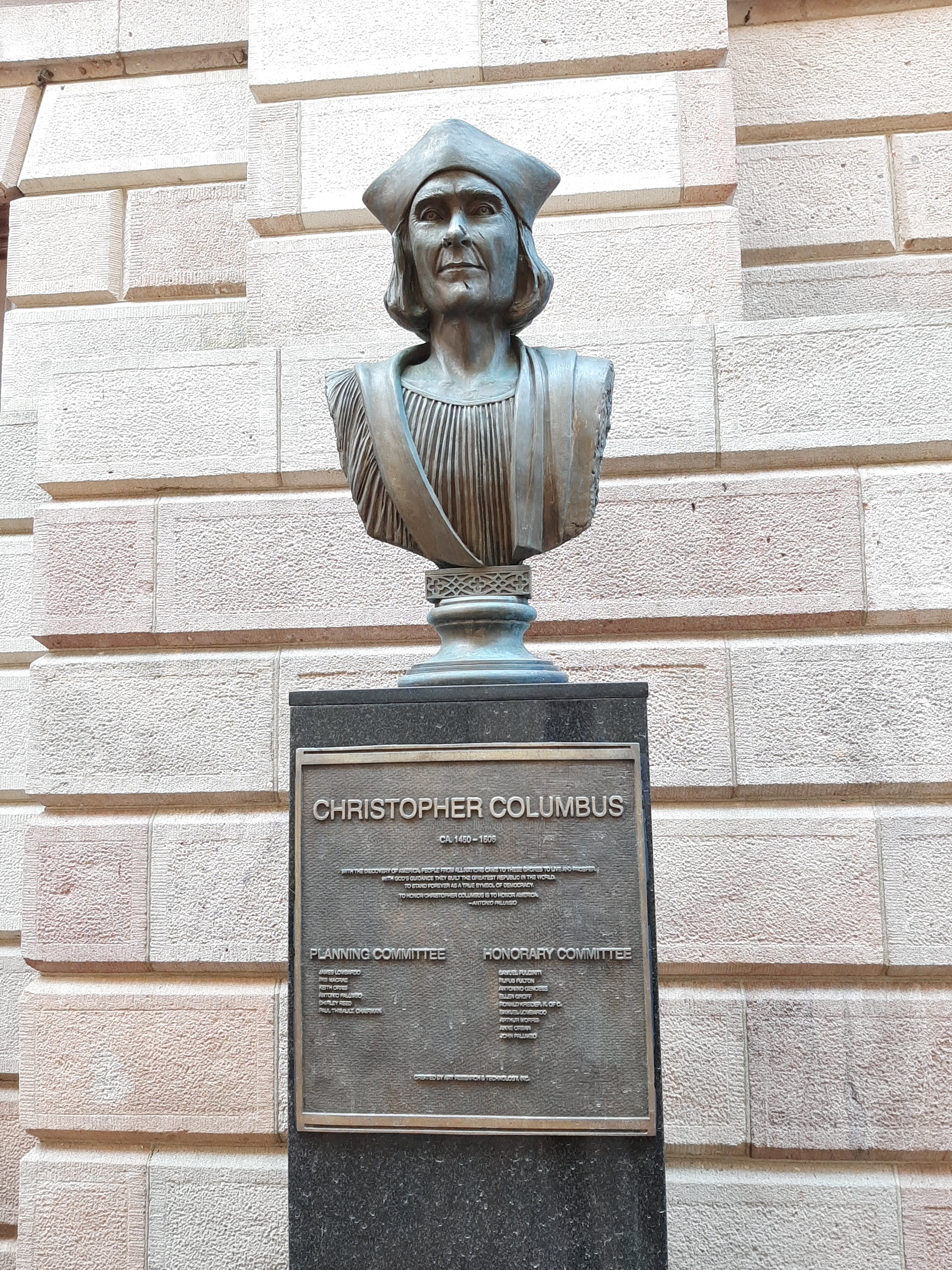
- The bust on Lenox Lane
- Artist: Art Research and Technology of Lancaster
- Year: 1992
- Medium: Bronze
- Subject: Christopher Columbus
- Dimensions: 2 ft. 4 in. x 1 ft. 9 in. x 1 ft.
- Location: Lancaster, PA; 40.0386°N 76.3041°W

A bust of Christopher Columbus was installed in Lancaster, Pennsylvania, United States in 1992. The bust was dedicated at the Lancaster County Courthouse on the 500th anniversary of Christopher Columbus’ discovery of America. Designed by Art Research and Technology of Lancaster at a cost of $13,000, the bronze bust depicts Columbus with chin-length hair, wearing a period hat and a pleated shirt and cloak. It was surveyed by the Smithsonian Institution's "Save Outdoor Sculpture!" program in 1995.

== History ==
The bust of Columbus was commissioned after a local Italian immigrant, Antonio Palumbo, wanted to give a token of appreciation to the city of Lancaster. Initially wanting to share his Italian heritage with a statue of Christopher Columbus, a fundraiser only brought in sufficient funds to pay for an over-sized bust. The bust was designed and built by Art Research and Technology of Lancaster, and dedicated on October 12, 1992 on Lenox Lane behind the county courthouse.

=== Controversy ===
Since its initial unveiling, where protesters gathered during the dedication, the bust of Columbus has been a source of controversy in Lancaster. Since then, numerous attempts to remove the bust sparked public discourse. Removal of the bust came under discussion in 2017 when local activists called it "insulting to Native Americans". At the time, the Lancaster City Council voted with unanimous support to keep the statue. Talks of removing the bust were reignited in June 2020 following the George Floyd protests, during which the bust was vandalized. It was toppled from its podium in mid-July 2020 during ongoing protests as well.

== See also ==
- List of monuments and memorials to Christopher Columbus
