= Monument to Christopher Columbus (Galway) =

Coordinates: 53°16′13″N 9°03′18″W

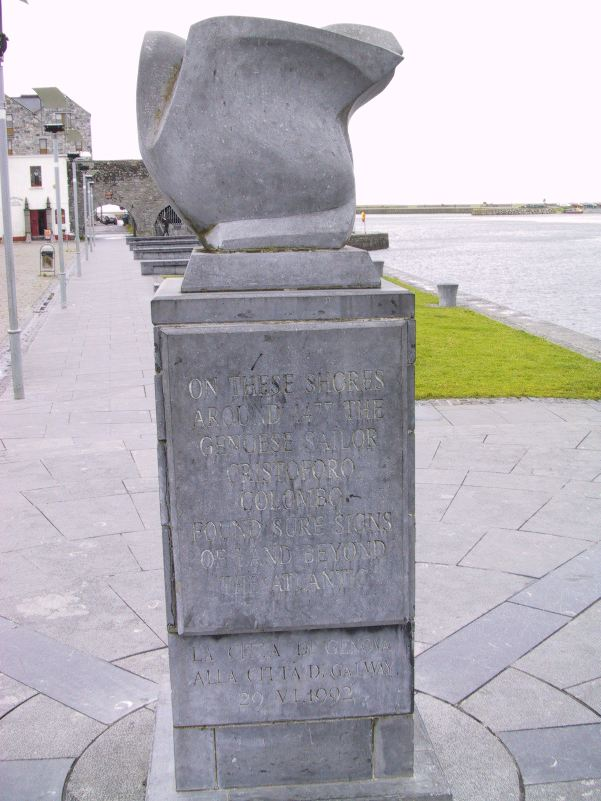

The Monument to Christopher Columbus is a monument in Galway, Ireland. The memorial was erected in 1992, the year of the Columbus Quincentenary, to commemorate Christopher Columbus's visit to the city in 1477. It stands next to the Spanish Arch.

== History ==
In 1992, a sculpture honouring Christopher Columbus' visit to Galway in 1477 was commissioned from Cork artist Mick Wilkins. The sculpture was gifted by Genoa, Columbus's hometown, to commemorate the 500th anniversary of Columbus's setting sail on the voyage that would result in his landing in North America.

The inscription on the plinth reads:

on these shores
around 1477 the
genoese sailor
cristoforo
colombo
found sure signs
of land beyond
the atlantic

la citta di genova
alla citta de galway
29.vi.1992

In June 2020, during the George Floyd protests, a number of monuments were removed or vandalized around the world, this included a number of Christopher Columbus statues in the United States. The monument in Galway was defaced on 10 June 2020, with calls for its removal. The political party People Before Profit called for the removal of the monument due to "Columbus' links to the genocide of Native Americans, the start of the transatlantic slave trade and the colonisation of the Americas", none of which are contextualised on the monument.

== See also ==
- List of monuments and memorials to Christopher Columbus
