= Monument to Christopher Columbus (Buenos Aires) =

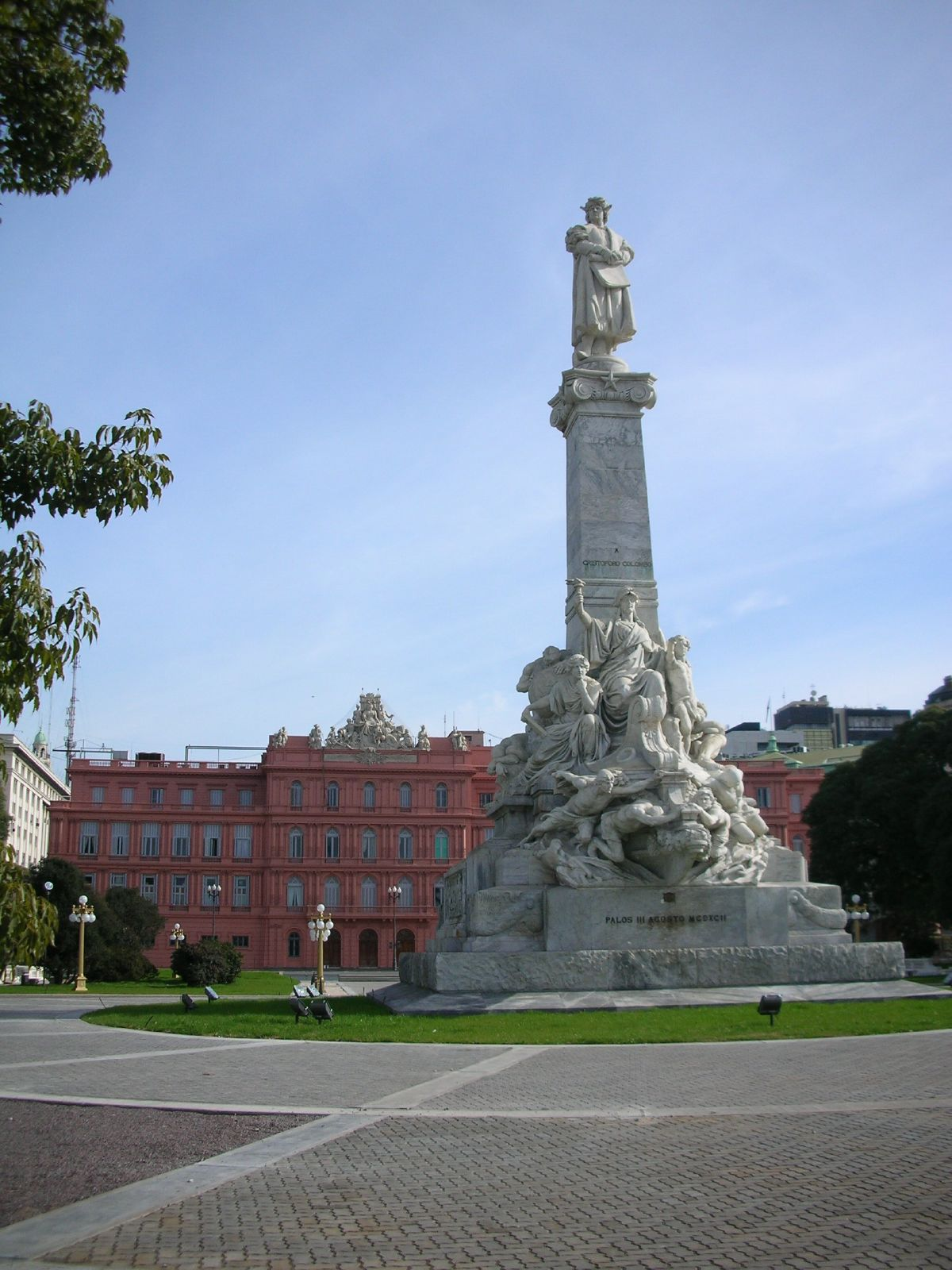
Columbus Monument, Buenos Aires, prior to its 2013 removal

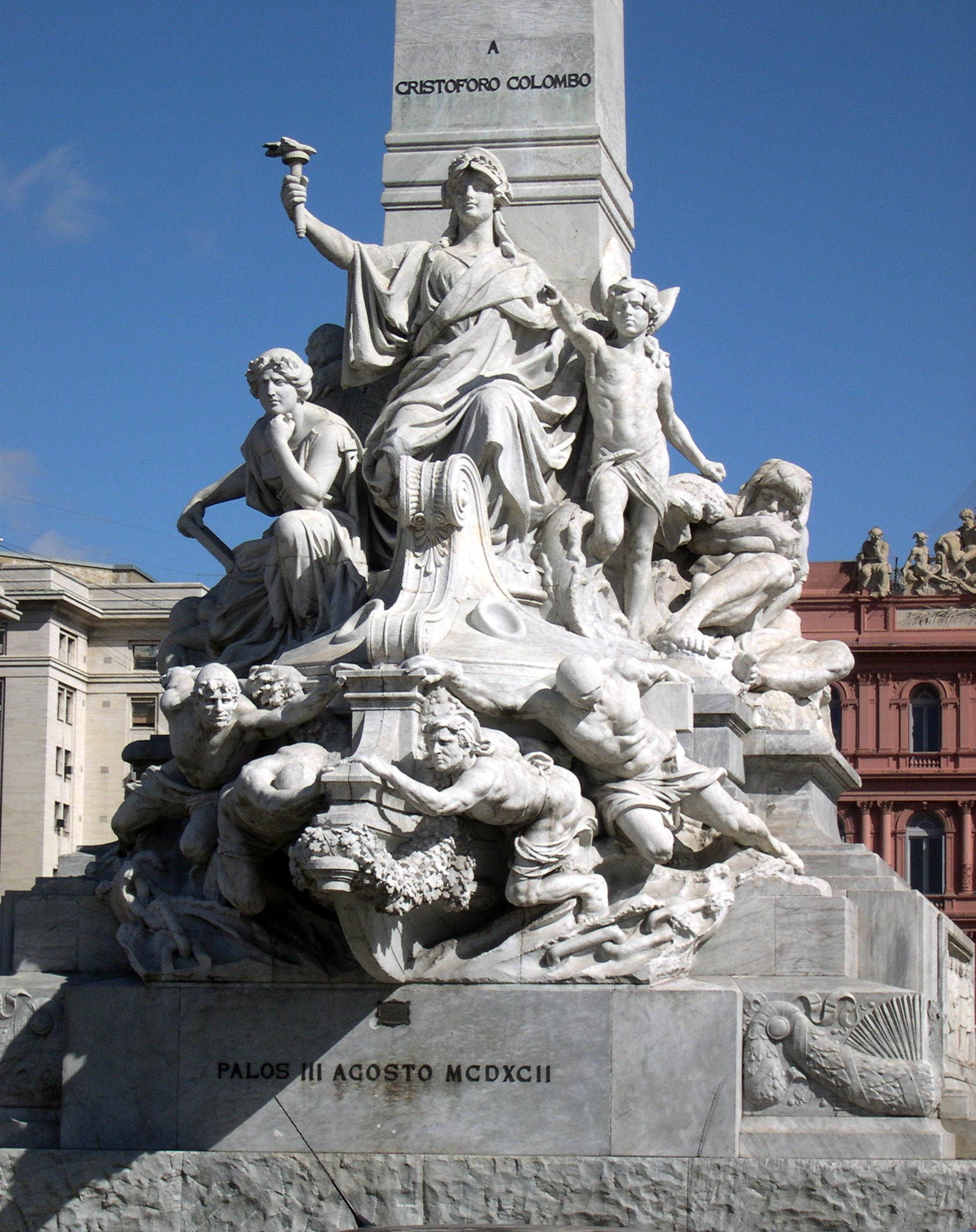
Columbus Monument, Buenos Aires (detail)

The Monument to Christopher Columbus was located in the plaza behind the government house in the city of Buenos Aires in Argentina. It was located in the Columbus Park, between the Casa Rosada and La Avenida La Rabida.

The monument was a gift celebrating the 1910 Centennial of Argentine independence from Spain. It was sponsored by the Argentine-Italian community, led by Italian immigrant businessman Antonio Devoto. Work of the Italian sculptor Arnaldo Zocchi, the foundation stone of the monument was placed on May 24, 1910 and the inauguration took place on June 15, 1921. The statue was a source of pride for the Buenos Aires Italian community, planned for the centennial of Argentine independence in 1910.

For previously maligned Italian immigrants to Argentina, sponsoring the statue, which had pride of place in front of the Casa Rosada, brought them a level of respect they had not previously enjoyed. Nineteenth-century liberal thinker Juan Bautista Alberdi did not considered southern European Catholics, such as Italians, desirable immigrants. The centennial of Argentine independence was an occasion to create new monuments in the capital. In particular, immigrant communities were invited to submit proposals to the Centennial Commission. The immigrant communities of Italy, Spain, France, and Germany vied for prominent placement of their monuments. The site for the Columbus statue behind the Casa Rosada in the Parque Colón was already occupied by an enormous fountain, which was ordered moved. The statue of Columbus was on a high column, with the navigator holding a map in his hand and facing the sea, looking toward Europe. An inscription on the monument from Seneca's Medea alluded to foreknowledge of the existence of the New World, and the "discovery" by Columbus as the fulfillment of a prophecy. There were a series of allegorical statues at the base of the column depicting science, civilization, and genius. On another part of the base allegorical figures to Christian faith and justice are meant to convey European civilization's benefits brought to the New World by Columbus. The original plans did not directly tie Columbus to Argentina, and the Centennial Commission requested additions. This resulted in bas reliefs of Columbus, one with his requesting permission from the Catholic Monarchs of Spain, Isabel and Ferdinand, to sail West. The other shows Columbus on his return, bringing indigenous slaves. The monument was made of Italian marble by an Italian sculptor in Italy, and until the requested changes in design, it had nothing to do with Argentina or the Italian immigrant community. On a number of points, the placement and symbolism of the Columbus statue became problemic for a number of Argentines after the 1992, the 500th anniversary of Columbus's voyage.

The statue became a source of controversy in 2013, when President Cristina Fernández de Kirchner decided to replace Columbus with one of Juana Azurduy de Padilla, a Mestiza revolutionary army leader during the war of independence. The statue to Azurduy was commissioned with funding with the help of Bolivian president Evo Morales and inaugurated in July 2015. In 2013 the statue to Columbus was dismantled and for two years lay in pieces on the ground while the statue to Azurduy by Argentine sculptor Andrés Zerneri was constructed. The Argentine Italian community and other Argentines were outraged at the change. Legal battles were fought about the destination of the Columbus statue. In 2017 it was moved within the capital and placed at the waterfront on Avenida Costanera Rafael Obligado, adjacent to Aeroparque Jorge Newbery. The two years when it was in pieces caused damage to the marble, and it had to be restored. The new site required reinforcement of the ground, to support the tons of marble. The Azurduy statue was moved in 2017 to a less prominent place in the central core of Buenos Aires, in front of the Kirchner Cultural Center. The controversy over the Columbus and Azurduy statues highlights conflicts in Argentina over historical memory, national identity, and claims to public space.

== See also ==
- List of monuments and memorials to Christopher Columbus
