= Statue of Christopher Columbus (Norwalk, Connecticut) =

Former public statue in Norwalk, Connecticut

- Subject: Christopher Columbus
- Location: Norwalk, Connecticut, U.S.; 41.109606°N 73.418521°W

A statue of Christopher Columbus was installed in Norwalk, Connecticut, United States.

== History ==
The statue was dedicated and installed at the city's Columbus Magnet School on Columbus Day, October 12, 1940. It was relocated to the city's Heritage Wall in 1983.

The memorial was removed by order of the city in June 2020. The city hired contractors to remove the statue at night, in order to preempt possible conflict between supporters of the statue and those calling for its removal.

== See also ==
- List of monuments and memorials to Christopher Columbus
- List of monuments and memorials removed during the George Floyd protests
