= Statue of Christopher Columbus (Yonkers, New York) =

- Artist: Jeronimo Suñol
- Year: 1894
- Subject: Christopher Columbus
- Location: Yonkers, New York, U.S.; 40°55′43.91″N 73°53′36.34″W

A 7 feet (2.1 m) tall statue of Christopher Columbus was erected in Yonkers, New York in May 1894 to commemorate 400 years after Columbus's conquests. It was created by Spanish sculptor Jeronimo Suñol in 1882 and donated to the city by the New York Genealogical and Biographical Society. In August 2017, it was vandalized and decapitated.

== See also ==
- List of monuments and memorials to Christopher Columbus
