= Statue of Christopher Columbus (Newburgh, New York) =

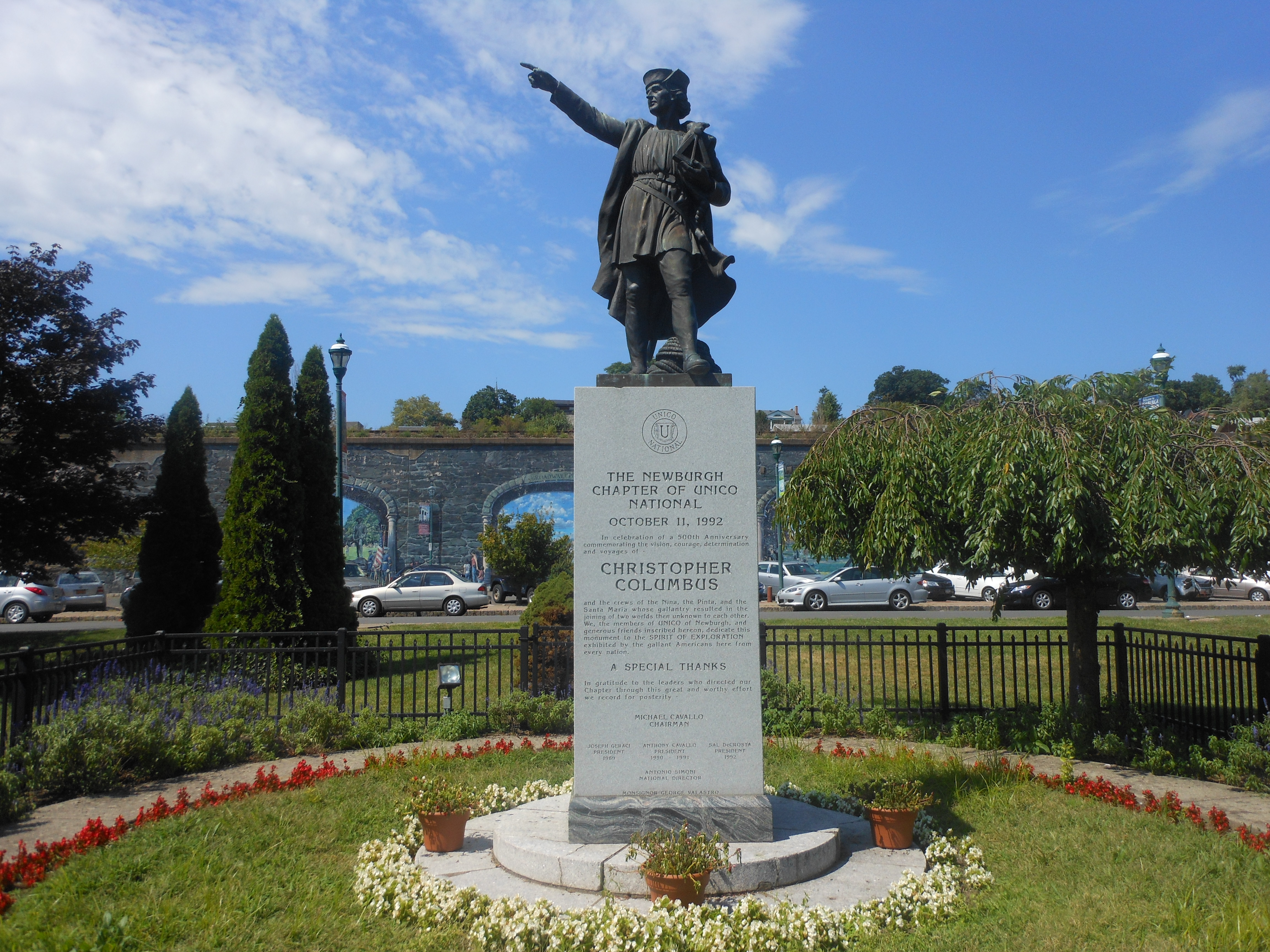
- The statue in 2012
- Year: 1992
- Subject: Christopher Columbus
- Location: Newburgh, New York, U.S.; 41°30′14.51″N 74°0′18.76″W

The Christopher Columbus statue in Newburgh, New York, was erected in 1992 by UNICO, an Italian American service organization active in the city. At the time, the majority of white residents in the city were Italian American, and as with most Columbus monuments, felt the statue represented their community. It commemorated the 500th anniversary of Columbus's voyage in 1492. This monument is one of two in the city conceived in recognition of Italian Americans.

== Description ==
The monument stands in a fenced-off flower garden, forming the center of Unico Park on the Newburgh Waterfront. At the time of its construction, development on the waterfront was steadily beginning. UNICO commissioned the statue from Pompeian Studios of Bronxville; it was shipped there from their foundry at Villa Ilice in the Italian city of Carrara. The statue points an outstretched arm towards the Atlantic Ocean, with a small bundle of rope and anchor at its feet.

== History ==
=== Vandalism ===
During Columbus Day week in 2018, the statue's hands were painted red, and on its base the word "HISTORY" was spray painted. The UNICO chapter was notified, as were the police. Following the removal of statues as part of George Floyd protests, Newburghers have started a petition to the city council asking for the statue's replacement.

== See also ==
- 1992 in art
- List of monuments and memorials to Christopher Columbus
