= Statue of Christopher Columbus (Camden, New Jersey) =

Statue of Christopher Columbus, formerly installed in Camden, New Jersey, U.S.

- Subject: Christopher Columbus
- Location: Camden, New Jersey, U.S.; 39.93653°N 75.09168°W

A statue of Christopher Columbus stood in Camden, New Jersey, United States. The memorial was removed in June 2020. Levi Coombs III, pastor of the nearby First Refuge Progressive Baptist Church, stated that residents had called for the removal of the statue for 40 years but been ignored until the aftermath of the George Floyd protests. Camden Mayor Frank Moran stated, "There were a lot of atrocities toward the human beings that were on the island of Puerto Rico and other Caribbean islands by this individual, and I believe [the statue] is and was offensive to all people of color, whether black or brown."

== See also ==
- List of monuments and memorials to Christopher Columbus
- List of monuments and memorials removed during the George Floyd protests
