= Statue of Christopher Columbus (Chelsea, Massachusetts) =

Coordinates: 42°23′24″N 71°02′20″W

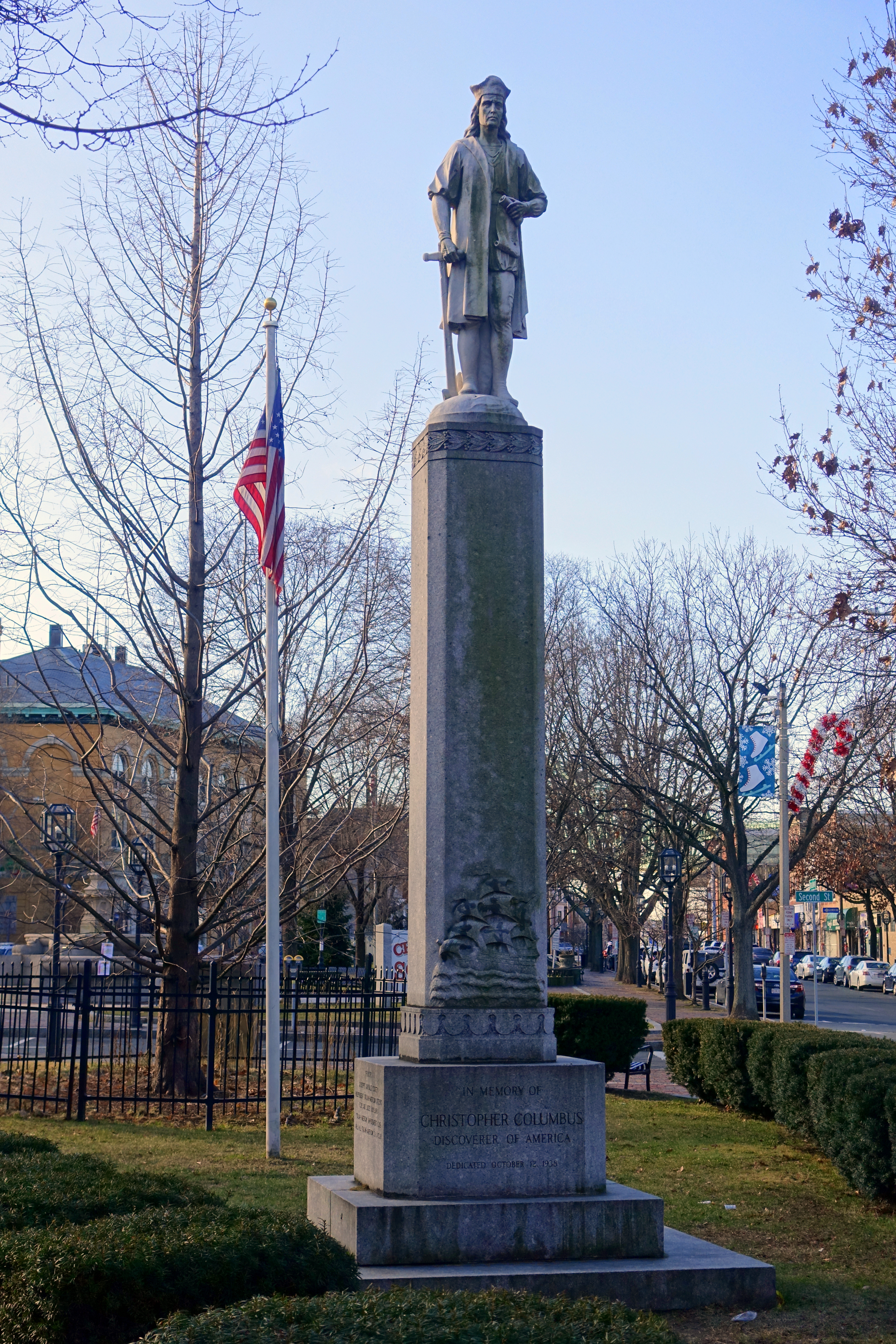
- The statue in 2018
- Subject: Christopher Columbus
- Location: Chelsea, Massachusetts, U.S.

A statue of Christopher Columbus is installed in Chelsea, Massachusetts, United States.

== See also ==
- List of monuments and memorials to Christopher Columbus
