= Statue of Christopher Columbus (Chicago) =

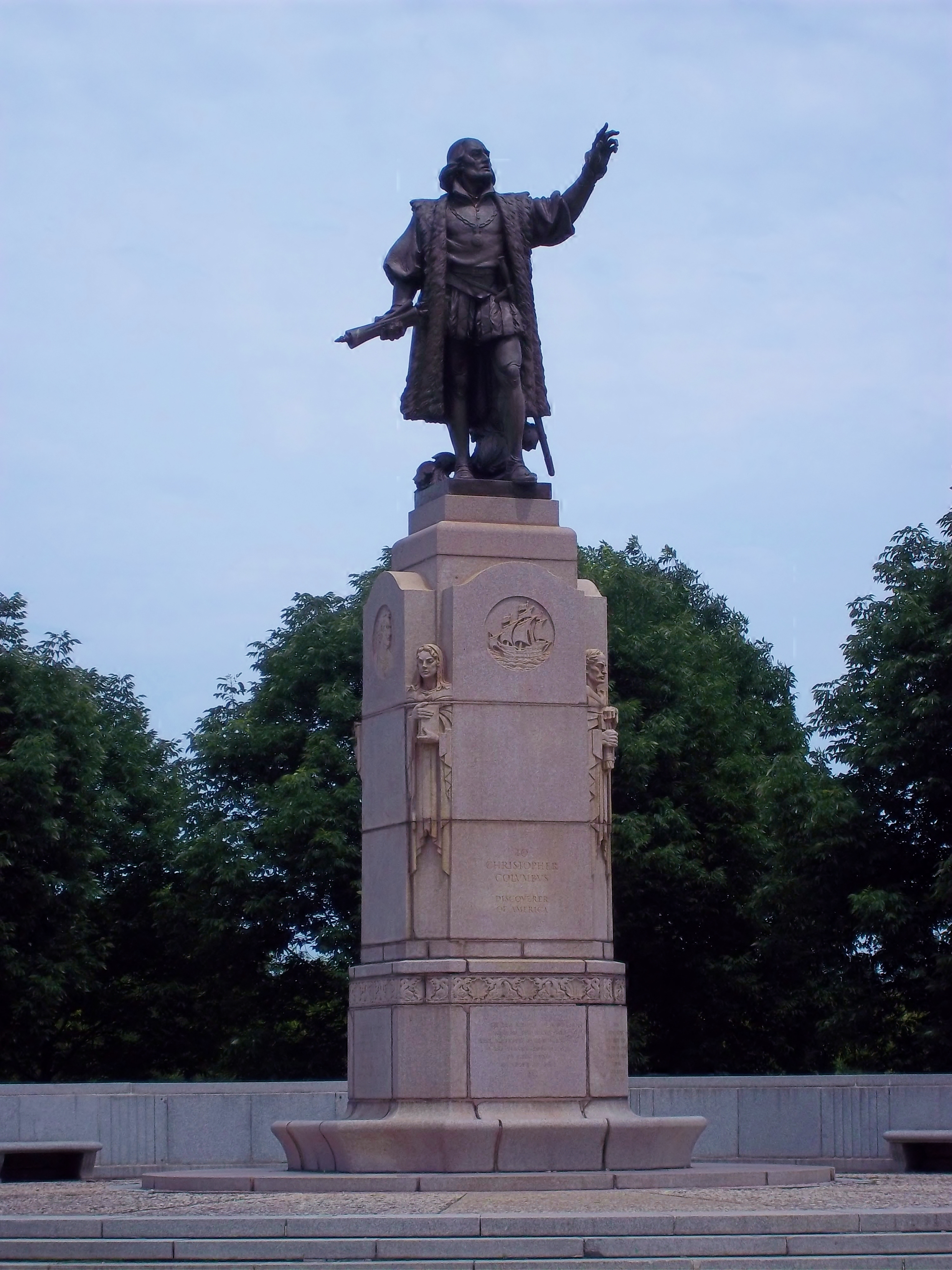
- Christopher Columbus, Grant Park, Chicago, Illinois, before its removal in 2020
- Artist: Carlo Brioschi
- Year: 1933
- Medium: Bronze
- Subject: Christopher Columbus
- Location: Chicago; 41.867939°N 87.619628°W

Christopher Columbus is a bronze statue of Italian explorer and navigator Christopher Columbus. It was installed during 1933 in Chicago's Grant Park, in the U.S. state of Illinois. Created by the Milanese-born sculptor Carlo Brioschi, it was set on an exedra and pedestal designed with the help of architect Clarence H. Johnston. It was removed and put in storage in 2020.

== History ==
In 1933, Chicago celebrated its 100th anniversary with the Century of Progress World's Fair. In conjunction with the fair, Chicago's Italian-American community donated the artwork to the city. The statue was unveiled and dedicated in a ceremony on August 3, 1933, as part of Italian day at the fair.

The statue was vandalized on June 13, 2020, during the George Floyd protests. On July 17, 2020, protestors attempted to topple the work and a number of injuries occurred during a confrontation with police. The statue was subsequently removed in the early morning of July 24, by order of Chicago's Mayor Lori Lightfoot. Two other statues of Columbus, one in Arrigo Park in Chicago's Little Italy, and one in the Far South Side at the intersection of 92nd Street, Exchange Avenue and South Chicago Avenue, were also removed in 2020.

As of 2025, Chicago officials announced the statue at Grant Park would not be returning. The Chicago Park District made an agreement with Chicago’s Joint Civic Committee of Italian Americans to display the Arrigo Park statue of Columbus at a planned museum dedicated to the history of Italian immigrants.

The plinth of the Grant Park Columbus statue is slated for removal, and no replacement for the statue has been proposed.

== Design ==
The bronze, beaux arts statue shows Columbus standing and gesturing into the distance with one hand. In his other hand, he holds a scrolled map at his side. On the sides of the statue's art deco pedestal are carved depictions of: one of Columbus' ships, the Santa Maria; astronomer and mathematician, Paolo Toscanelli, who plotted the course to the "New World;" the explorer, Amerigo Vespucci; and the seal of the City of Genoa. In the four corners of the pedestal are busts allegorically representing, Faith, Courage, Freedom, and Strength. Despite appearances, Brioschi's son has denied that the figure holding a fasces representing Strength was a portrait of Benito Mussolini, leader of Fascist Italy.

== Gallery ==
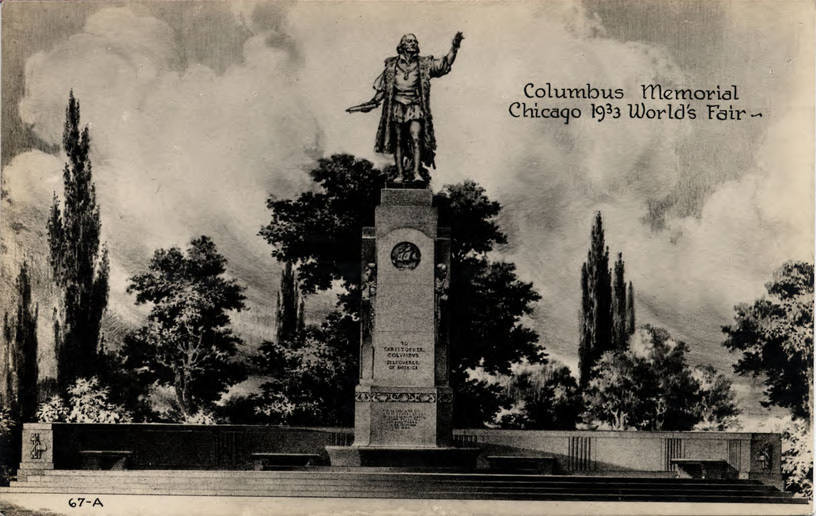
Postcard of the statue in 1933

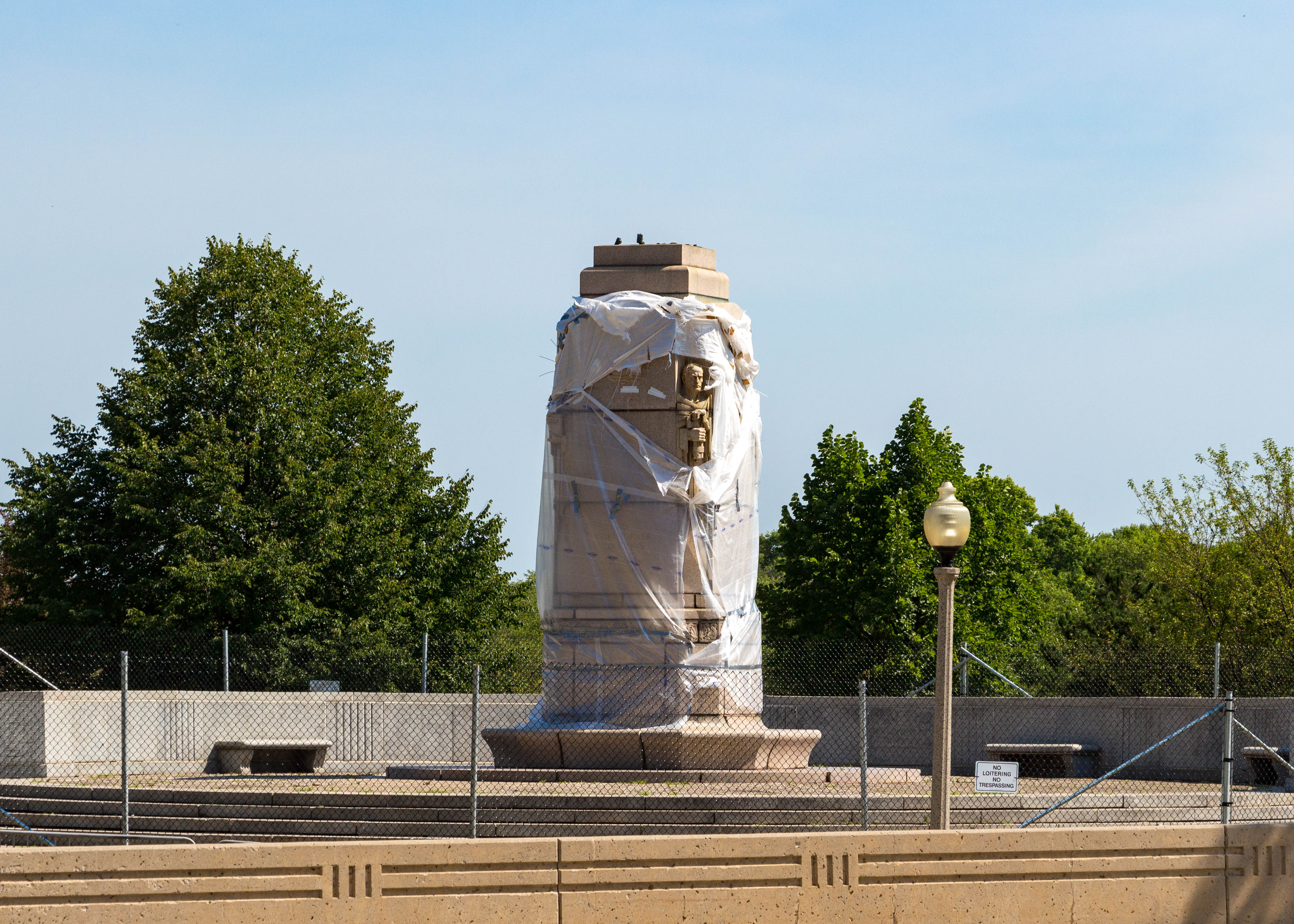
Pedestal following the statue's removal in July 2020

== See also ==
- List of monuments and memorials to Christopher Columbus
- List of public art in Chicago
