= Statue of Christopher Columbus (Baton Rouge, Louisiana) =

Statue of Christopher Columbus in Baton Rouge, Louisiana, U.S.

- Subject: Christopher Columbus
- Location: Baton Rouge, Louisiana; 30°26′35.8″N 91°11′23.6″W

A statue of Christopher Columbus is installed in Baton Rouge, Louisiana, United States.

== See also ==
- List of monuments and memorials to Christopher Columbus
