= Statue of Christopher Columbus (Middletown, Connecticut) =

Statue of Christopher Columbus formerly installed in Middletown, Connecticut, U.S.

- Subject: Christopher Columbus
- Location: Middletown, Connecticut, U.S.; 41.559201°N 72.643375°W

The Middletown, Connecticut Christopher Columbus statue was a memorial to Columbus that was installed in the city's Harbor Park. The sculpture was donated to the city in 1996 by the Italian American Civic Order, the Italian Society of Middletown and local Italian-American families.

The statue has been repeatedly vandalized. In 2016 the test on its plinth, reading "discoverer of America" was changed to "looter of America". It was damaged in 2017 when vandals chipped away the sculpture's nose. Also in 2017, vandals painted the statue's hands in red, and left the spray-painted text "kill the colonizer" on the statue's base. In 2019 it was vandalized again with red spray-paint.

The statue was removed in June 2020.

== See also ==
- List of monuments and memorials to Christopher Columbus
- List of monuments and memorials removed during the George Floyd protests
