= Statue of Christopher Columbus (New London, Connecticut) =

Removed marble statue of Christopher Columbus

- Subject: Christopher Columbus
- Location: New London, Connecticut, U.S.; 41.35046°N 72.100998°W

The New London, Connecticut statue of Christopher Columbus was a marble statue installed in the city from 1928 to 2020. In June, 2020 the New London City council voted to remove the statue from public land.

== History ==
The statue, given to the city as a gift by Italian-Americans, was unveiled on Columbus Day, October 12, 1928. Its installation was delayed when the ship it had traveled on from Italy was seized for transporting a cargo of heroin. The nine foot, six inch statue was sculpted in marble by the Italian artist Armand Battelli, at a cost of $7000.

In 2017 a group of local citizens sought to legally and physically protect the statue from removal. In June 2020 more than 6000 people signed a petition to remove the statue, and the memorial became the subject of extensive news coverage. Following a successful city council vote on its proposed removal, the statue was banned from being sited on public land. New London's mayor Michael Passero said that the statue had become "a lightning rod for civil discontent". The statue was removed June 16, 2020 at the order of the city council.

== See also ==
- List of monuments and memorials to Christopher Columbus
- List of monuments and memorials removed during the George Floyd protests
