= Statue of Christopher Columbus (Denver) =

Former public sculpture in Denver, Colorado, by William F. Joseph

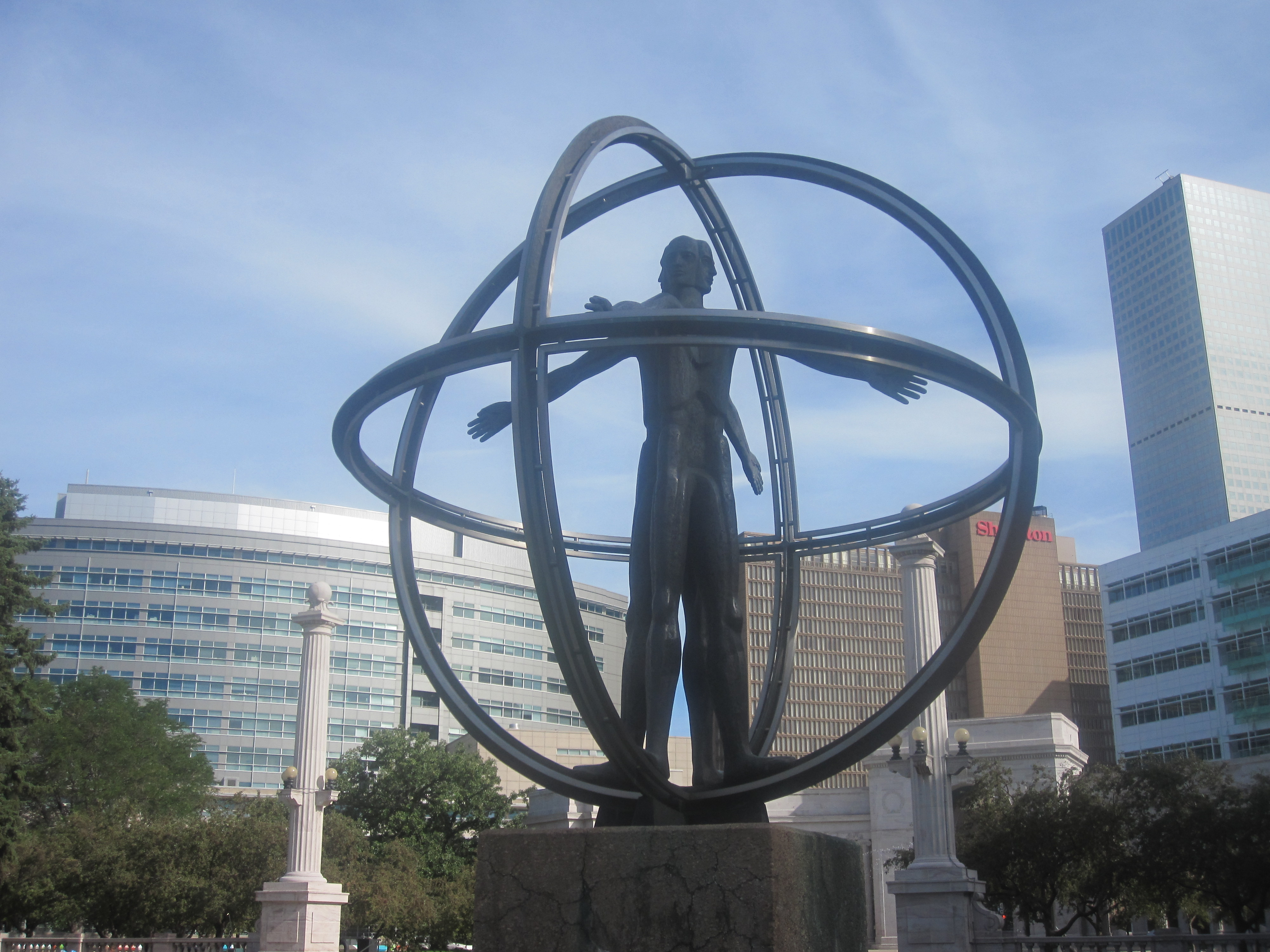
- The statue in 2010
- Location: Denver, Colorado, U.S.; 39.73956°N 104.98866°W

A statue of Christopher Columbus was installed in Denver, Colorado, United States. It was the work of Denver-based artist William F. Joseph, dedicated in 1972. Joseph's statue was vandalized and torn down by protestors in June 2020 during the civil unrest that followed the murder of George Floyd in May 2020. A number of monuments and memorials across the United States associated with racial injustice were vandalized, destroyed or removed. The statue is being stored at an undisclosed location.

== See also ==
- List of monuments and memorials to Christopher Columbus
- List of monuments and memorials removed during the George Floyd protests
