= Statue of Christopher Columbus (St. Louis) =

Former public statue in St. Louis, Missouri

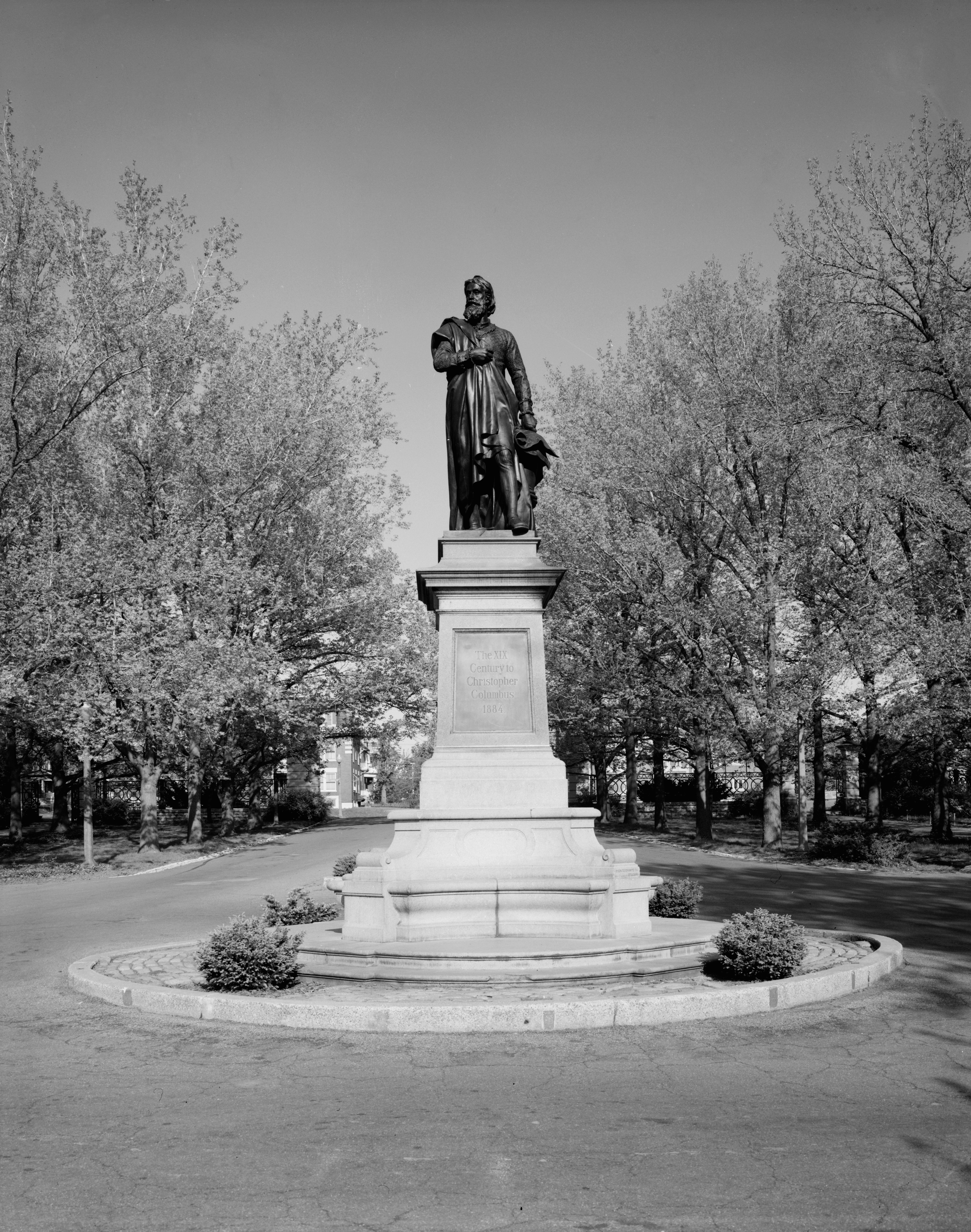
- The monument
- Subject: Christopher Columbus
- Location: St. Louis, Missouri, U.S.; 38.60512°N 90.24303°W

In 1884, a statue of Christopher Columbus was installed in St. Louis, Missouri, United States. The dedication inscription on its base read: “The XIX Centurÿ to Christopher Columbus 1884.”

The monument was removed in June 2020.

== See also ==
- List of monuments and memorials to Christopher Columbus
- List of monuments and memorials removed during the George Floyd protests
