= Statue of Christopher Columbus (Bridgeport, Connecticut) =

Statue formerly installed in Bridgeport, Connecticut, U.S.

- Subject: Christopher Columbus
- Location: Bridgeport, Connecticut, U.S.; 41°09′36″N 73°11′20″W

A statue of Christopher Columbus is installed in Bridgeport, Connecticut's Seaside Park, in the United States.

== History ==
It was installed in 1965, and is the work of Clemente Spampinato, an Italian-American artist.

The statue was vandalized in 2017; red paint was thrown on the artwork and "Kill the Colonizer" was written at the base.

In 2020, the statue was removed and placed in storage during the George Floyd protests.

== See also ==
- List of monuments and memorials to Christopher Columbus
- List of monuments and memorials removed during the George Floyd protests
