= List of monuments and memorials to Christopher Columbus =

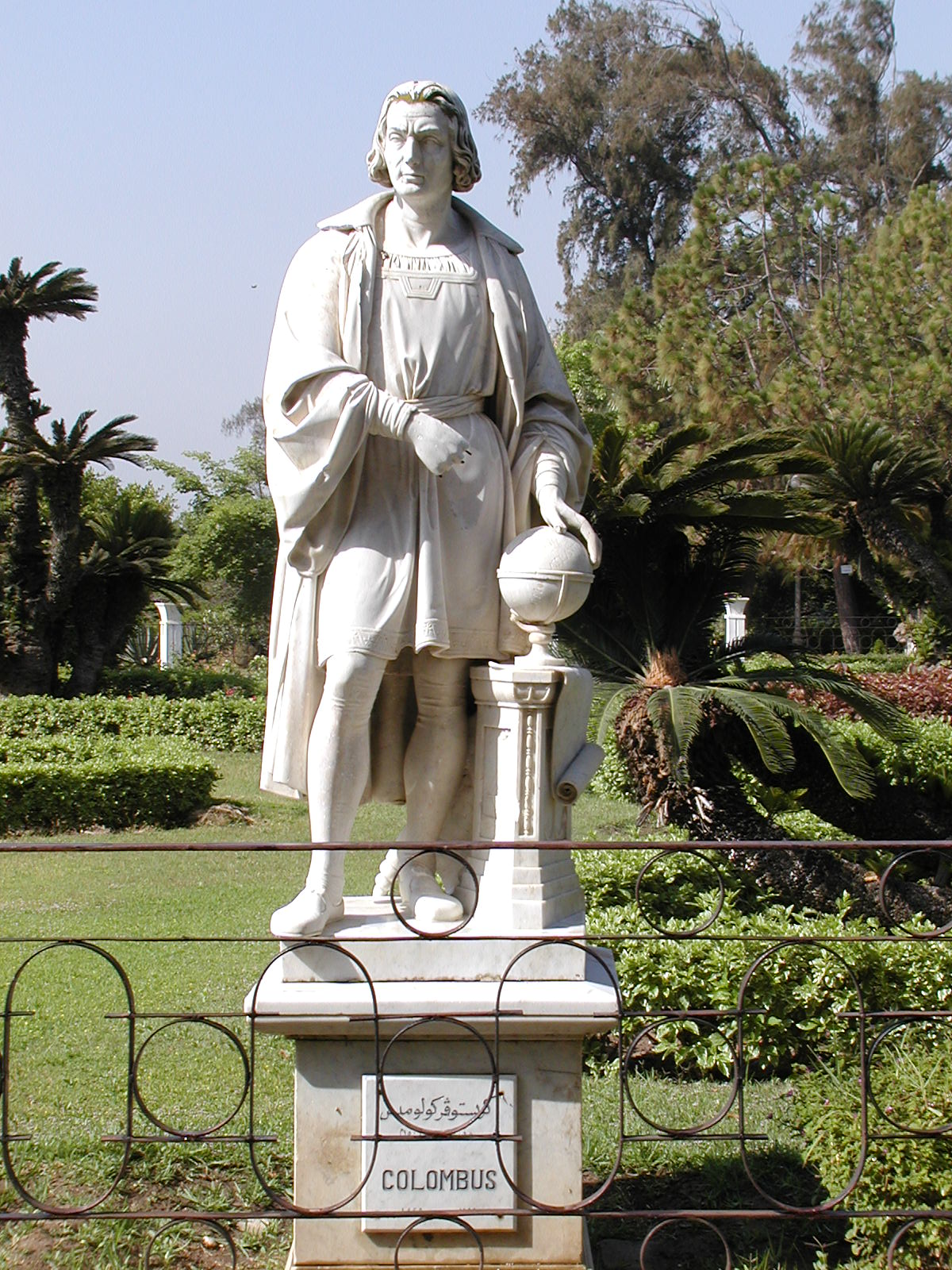
Statue in Alexandria, Egypt

This is a list of monuments and memorials to Christopher Columbus.

== Holidays ==
- Argentina
  - The holiday was changed from El día de la Raza (The Day of the Race) (1916) to "Day of Respect of Cultural Diversity" in 2010.
- Colombia
  - El día de la Raza y de la Hispanidad
- Costa Rica
  - The holiday was changed from Día de la Raza to Día del Encuentro de las Culturas (Day of the Encounter of Cultures).
- Spain
  - Fiesta Nacional de España (National Day of Spain)
- United States
  - Columbus Day
- Venezuela
  - The holiday was changed from El día de la Raza (The Day of the Race) to Día de la Resistencia Indígena (Day of Indigenous Resistance) in 2002.

== Monuments ==
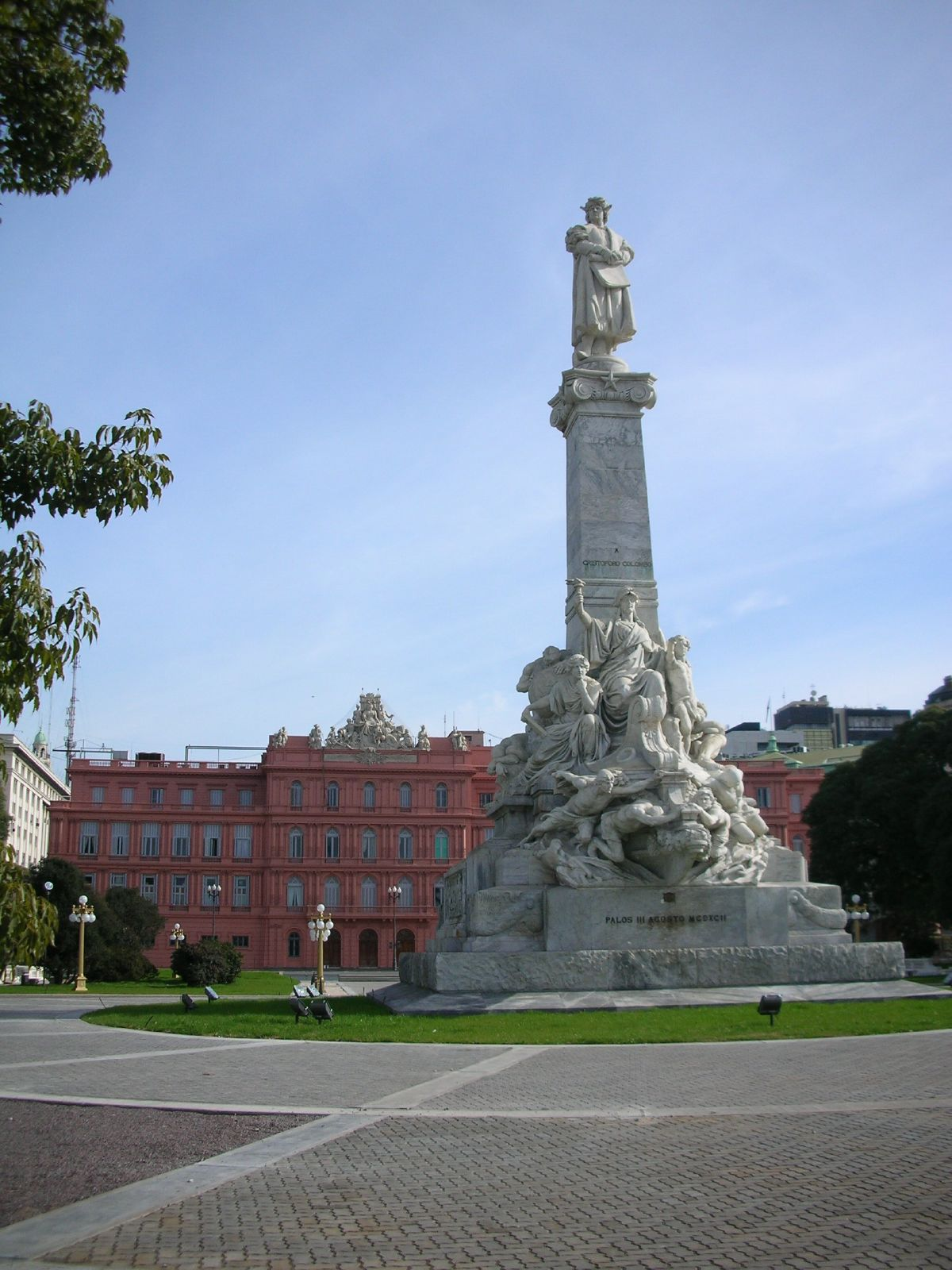
Monument to Christopher Columbus in Buenos Aires, Argentina

=== Argentina ===
- Ayacucho
  - Cristóbal Colón (Christopher Columbus) (1895)
- Bernal
  - Estatua de Cristóbal Colón (Statue of Christopher Columbus) (1889)
- Buenos Aires
  - Homenaje de Billiken a Colón (Monolith for Columbus)
  - Cristóbal Colón 'en las Americas' (Christopher Columbus 'in the Americas') (1992)
  - Busto de Cristóbal Colón (Bust of Columbus) (1884)
  - Monument to Christopher Columbus (Buenos Aires) (1921)
  - Monumento a Colón en Liniers (Columbus Monument in Liniers) (1921)
- Chivilcoy
  - Cristóbal Colón (Christopher Columbus) (1892)
- Colón
  - Cristóbal Colón (Christopher Columbus) (1953)
- Córdoba
  - Medallón con retrato en relieve de Colón (Relief portrait medaillon of Columbus)(1930)
- Gaiman
  - Monumento a Cristóbal Colón (Columbus Monument) (1892)
- General Roca
  - Cristóbal Colón (Christopher Columbus) (1929)
- La Plata
  - Monumento a Cristóbal Colón (Columbus Monument)
- Laboulaye
  - Monumento de españoles e italianos (Monument of Spanish and Italians) (1965)
- Mar del Plata
  - Estatua de Cristóbal Colón (Statue of Christopher Columbus)
- Mendoza
  - Monumento a la Hermandad Hispano-Argentina (1947)
- Monte Caseros
  - Cristóbal Colón (Christopher Columbus) (1892)
- Salta
  - Cristóbal Colón (Christopher Columbus) (1986)
- San Carlos de Bariloche
  - Cristobal Colón llega a América (Columbus reaches America) (1947)
- Santa Fe
  - Monumento a Cristóbal Colón (Columbus Monument) (1940s)
- Santa Teresita
  - Cristóbal Colón (Christopher Columbus) (1992)
- Villaguay
  - Busto de Cristóbal Colón (Bust of Columbus)

=== Bahamas ===
- Long Island
  - Columbus Monument (1989)
- New Providence
  - Christopher Columbus Statue (1830)
- San Salvador
  - Chicago Herald Monument (1891)
  - Columbus Monument (1956)
  - Mexico Olympic Monument (1968), one of three key locations along the 1968 Olympic torch route.
  - Nao Santa Maria Foundation Monument (1991)
  - Olympic Monument at Columbus Landing (1992)
  - Tappan Monument/Heloise Marker (1951)
  - Underwater Monument
  - UNESCO Monument/Monument of the Quincentennial (1991)

=== Belgium ===
- Brussels
  - The Barcelona Monument to Columbus is reproduced in miniature scale in the miniature park Mini-Europe.

=== Bolivia ===
- La Paz
  - Cristóbal Colón (Christopher Columbus) (1920)

=== Brazil ===
- Muçum
  - Cristóvão Colombo (Christopher Columbus) (1925)
- Rio de Janeiro
  - Cristóvão Colombo (Christopher Columbus)
- Santa Rosa
  - Cristóvão Colombo (Christopher Columbus) (1925)
- Santos
  - Homenagem ao Descobrimento da América (Monument for the Discovery of America) (1992)
- São Paulo
  - Cristóvão Colombo (Christopher Columbus)

=== Canada ===
- Fredericton
  - Columbus Quincentennial Flagpole (1992)
- Montréal
  - Buste de Christophe Colombe (Bust of Columbus) (1976)
- Oromocto
  - Columbus Quincentennial Flagpole (1992)
- Regina
  - Model Santa Maria (1992)
- Toronto
  - Christopher Columbus Statue (1985)
- Vancouver
  - Colombo giovinetto (The First Inspiration of the Boy Columbus) (1870)

=== Chile ===
- Arica
  - Busto de Cristóbal Colón (Bust of Columbus) (1910)
- Iquique
  - Busto de Cristóbal Colón (Bust of Columbus) (1982)
- Santiago de Chile
  - Busto de Cristóbal Colón (Bust of Columbus) (1892 or earlier)
  - 500th anniversary (1992)
- Valparaiso
  - Cristóbal Colón en la Avenida Brasil (Statue of Columbus on the Avenida Brasil) (1877)
  - Cristóbal Colón (Christopher Columbus) (1986)

=== Colombia ===
- Barranquilla
  - Estatua de Cristóbal Colón (Statue of Columbus) (1910)
  - Busto de Cristóbal Colón (Bust of Columbus) (1979)
- Bogotá
  - Monumento a la Reina Isabel y Cristobal Colón (Monument for Queen Isabella and Columbus) (1906)
- Cartagena
  - Christopher Columbus Monument (1895)

=== Costa Rica ===
- Puerto Limón
  - Cristóbal y Hernando Colón (Christopher and Hernando Columbus) (1992)
- San José
  - Cristóbal Colón (Christopher Columbus) (1960)

=== Cuba ===
- Baracoa
  - Cruz de Parra
  - Cristóbal Colón (Christopher Columbus)
- Bayamo
  - Cristóbal Colón (Christopher Columbus) (1892)
- Cárdenas
  - Cristóbal Colón (Christopher Columbus) (1862)
- Cayo Bariay
  - Encounter of cultures (1992)
- Colón
  - Cristóbal Colón (Christopher Columbus) (1892)
- Guardalavaca (Banes)
  - Cristóbal Colón (Christopher Columbus)
- La Habana
  - Tumba de Colón (Columbus' Tomb)
  - Busto de Colón en la puerta del Cementerio de Colón (Bust of Columbus on the gate of Columbus' Cemetery) (1880)
  - Estatua de Colón en el Museo de la Ciudad (Statue of Columbus on the City Museum) (1862)
  - Busto de Colón en el Museo de la Revolución (Bust of Columbus in the Museum of the Revolution) (1928)
  - Busto de Colón en el Templete (Bust of Columbus in the Templete) (1828)
- Matanzas
  - Cristóbal Colón (Christopher Columbus)
- Santiago de Cuba
  - Cristóbal Colón (Christopher Columbus)

=== Dominican Republic ===
- Santo Domingo
  - Columbus Lighthouse (Faro a Colón, 1992). Museum, not a lighthouse, containing Columbus’ alleged remains.
  - Parque Colon (before 1887)

=== Ecuador ===
- Quito
  - Cristóbal Colón (Christopher Columbus)

=== Egypt ===
- Alexandria
  - Christopher Columbus Statue

=== El Salvador ===
- San Salvador
  - Cristóbal Colón y la reina Isabel (Statues of Columbus and Queen Isabella) (1924)

=== Guatemala ===
- Guatemala City
  - Monumento a Colón (Columbus Monument) (1896)
  - Cristóbal Colón (Christopher Columbus)
- Salcajá
  - Cruz de Colón (Columbus cross)

=== Haiti ===
- Port-au-Prince
  - Christophe Colomb (Christopher Columbus). Statue removed in 1987.

=== Honduras ===
- Comayagüela
  - Cristóbal Colón (Christopher Columbus) (1892)
- Trujillo
  - Cristóbal Colón (Christopher Columbus)

=== Ireland ===
- Galway
  - Monument to Christopher Columbus (1992)

=== Italy ===
- Abano Terme
  - Cristoforo Colombo (Christopher Columbus) (1956)
- Bettola
  - Lapide commemorativa del 400° anniversario (Plaque 400th anniversary) (1892)
  - Cristoforo Colombo (Statue of Christopher Columbus) (1892)
  - Lapidi sulla Torre Colombo (Plaques on the Torre Colombo) (1957)
- Bistagno
  - Colombo giovinetto (The First Inspiration of the Boy Columbus) (1870)
- Chiavari
  - Cristoforo Colombo (Statue of Christopher Columbus) (1935)
- Chiusanico
  - Caravella nel marciapiede (Caravel Pavement) (1992)
  - Casa Colombo (Columbus' House)
  - Lapide del'origine della famiglia di Colombo (Plaque Origin Columbus' Family) (1967)
  - Busto di Cristoforo Colombo (Bust of Columbus)
- Cicagna
  - Cristoforo Colombo (Statue of Christopher Columbus) (1892)
- Cogoleto
  - Lapide sulla chiesa Sta. Maria (Plaque on the church) (1888)
  - Lapide commemorativa della visita de Princetown nel 1847 (Plaque visit Princetown in 1847) (1888)
  - Monumento a Cristoforo Colombo (Columbus monument) (1864)
  - Ritratto e le scene della vita di Colombo (Columbus portrait and life scenes) (1992)
  - Affresco sulla casa natale di Colombo (Fresco on Columbus' birth house) (1650)
  - Lapide commemorativa della visita di re Umberto I nel 1857 (Plaque visit King Umberto in 1857) (1888)
  - Cogoleto Municipio (Portrait and ship model at Cogoleto town hall)
- Cuccaro Monferrato
  - Monumento del 500° anniversario (500th anniversary monument) (1992)
  - Lapide commemorativa del 500° anniversario (Plaque 500th anniversary) (1992)
  - Lapide commemorativa del dinastia di Colombo (Plaque for the Colombo dynasty) (1992)
- Diano Marina
  - Cristoforo Colombo (Statue of Christopher Columbus) (1892)
- Fontanarossa (Piacenza)
  - Lapide sulla casa natale di madre di Colombo (Plaque birthplace Columbus' mother, Susanna Fontanarossa) (1958)
- Genova
  - La Vela di Columbo (The Sail of Columbus) (1998)
  - Marciapiede Campopisano (Campopisano Pavement) (1992)
  - Rilievi del Castello D'Albertis (Reliefs in the Castello D'Albertis) (1892)
  - Colombo giovinetto (The First Inspiration of the Boy Columbus) (1870)
  - Il Bigo (The Mast) (1992)
  - Lapide sulla Palazzo di San Giorgio (Plaque on the San Giorgio Palace) (1951)
  - Affresco sulla facciata del Palazzo di San Giorgio (Fresco on the façade of the San Giorgio Palace)
  - Busto di Cristoforo Colombo nel Palazzo Reale (Bust of Columbus) (1864)
  - Monumento a Colombo nel Palazzo Rosso (Columbus Monument in the Palazzo Rosso) (1851)
  - Monumento a Colombo in Piazza Acquaverde (Columbus Monument on Piazza Acquaverde) (1846)
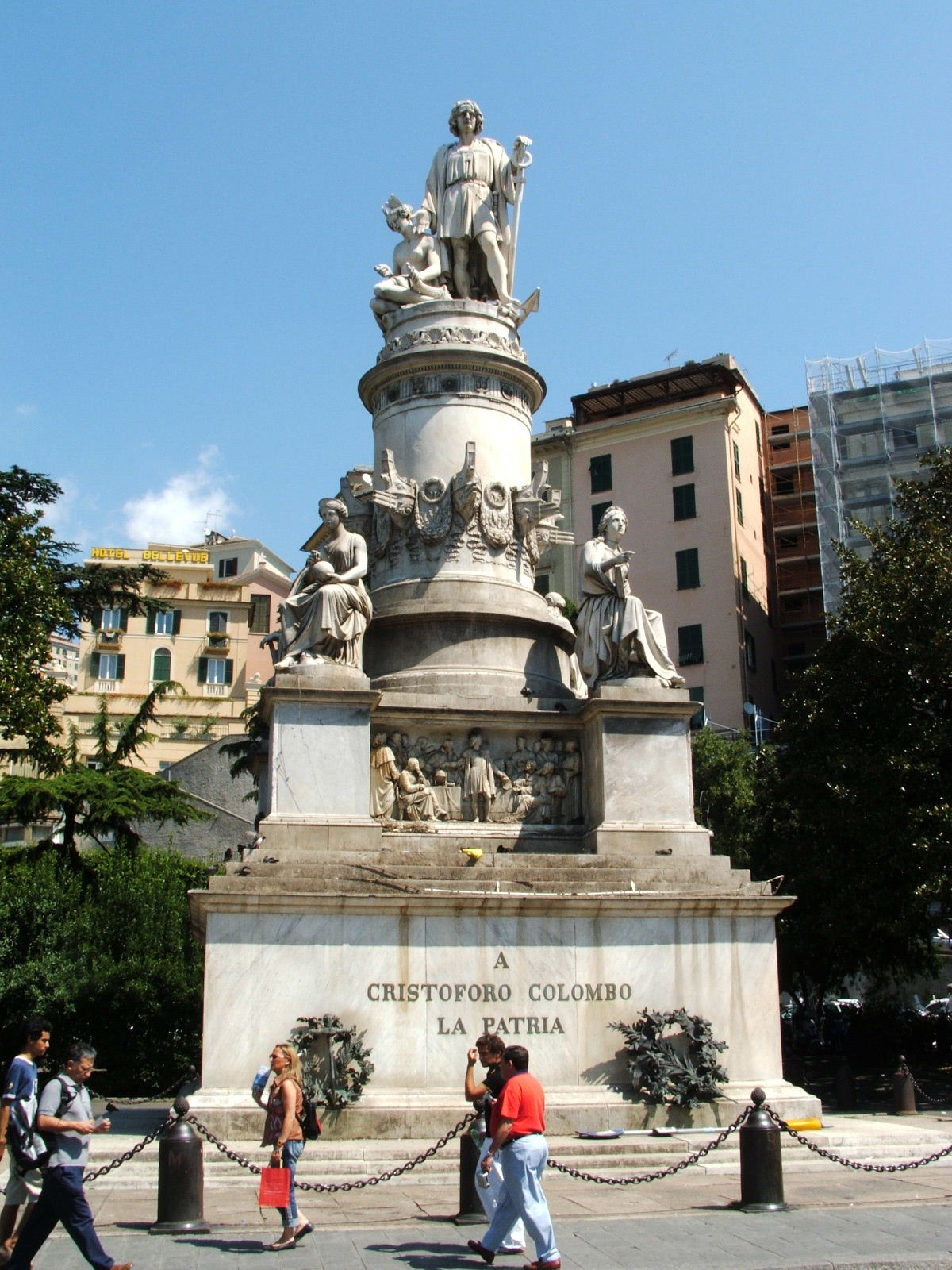
    Columbus Monument on Piazza Acquaverde
  - Rilievi su Piazza Dante (Reliefs on Piazza Dante)
  - Busto di Cristoforo Colombo nel Palazzo della Regione (Bust of Columbus in the Regione Liguria Palace) (1934)
  - Giardini di Colombo (Columbus gardens)
  - Ritratto di Colombo con le navi (Columbus Portrait with ships) (1984)
  - Busto di Cristoforo Colombo nel Stazione Marittima (Bust of Columbus in the Stazione Marittima)
  - La Nave Umana (Human Ship) (1992)
  - Statua di Cristoforo Colombo nel Liceo Colombo (Statue of Columbus in the Columbus school) (1892)
  - Busto di Cristoforo Colombo nel Palazzo Tursi (Bust of Columbus in the Palazzo Tursi) (1821)
  - Statua di Cristoforo Colombo in Via Gramsci (Statue of Columbus in the Via Gramsci) (1850)
  - Casa de Colombo (Columbus' House)
- La Spezia
  - Due statue di Cristoforo Colombo (Two Statues of Columbus)
- Lavagna
  - Cristoforo Colombo (Statue of Christopher Columbus) (1930)
- Lucca
  - San Michele e 35 protomi di figure storiche (Saint Michael and 35 protomes of historical figures)
- Milano
  - Statua di Cristoforo Colombo (Statue of Christopher Columbus) (19th century)
  - Busto di Cristoforo Colombo (Bust of Christopher Columbus) (1900)
- Mirandola
  - Medaglioni ritratto di illustri italiani (Portrait medaillons of famous Italians)
- Moconesi
  - Affresco con Colombo, Dante e Petrarca (Fresco showing Columbus, Dante and Petrarca)
  - La Casa degli Avi di Colombo(Columbus Ancestral house)
  - Scultura commemorativa di Colombo (Sculpture commemorating Columbus) (1979)
  - Lapide commemorativa de 1889 (Memorial plaque of 1889) (1889)
  - Lapide commemorativa del 500° anniversario (Plaque 500th Anniversary) (1992)
- Noli
  - Commemorazione della partenza di Colombo da Genova nel 1476 (Commemoration Columbus departure from Genoa in 1476) (1948)
- Ovada
  - Ritratto di Cristoforo Colombo (Portrait of Columbus) (1992)
- Parma
  - Colombo giovinetto (The First Inspiration of the Boy Columbus) (1870)
- Pavia
  - Busto di Cristoforo Colombo (Bust of Columbus) (1882)
- Rapallo
  - Affresco di Colombo e altri illustri italiani (Fresco of Columbus and other famous Italians)
  - Cristoforo Colombo (Christopher Columbus) (1914)
- Roma
  - Busto di Cristoforo Colombo (Bust of Columbus) (1817)
  - Busto di Cristoforo Colombo sul Pincio (Bust of Columbus on the Pincian Hill) (1849-51)
- San Colombano Certenoli
  - Cristoforo Colombo (Christopher Columbus) (1992)
- Santa Margherita Ligure
  - Cristoforo Colombo (Christopher Columbus) (1892)
- Santo Stefano d'Aveto
  - Ritratto di Colombo (Portrait of Columbus)
- Savona
  - Busto di Cristoforo Colombo (Bust of Christopher Columbus) (1928)
  - Lapide commemorativa sulla casa del padre di Colombo (Plaque on the house of Columbus' father) (1940)
  - Lapide commemorativa in Via San Giuliano (Plaque in the Via San Giuliano) (1892)
- Sestri Levante
  - Vela per Cristoforo Colombo (Christopher Columbus's Sail) (2002)
- Torino
  - Ritratto di Colombo (Portrait of Columbus) (1923)

=== Jamaica ===
- Discovery Bay
  - Cross at Columbus' Landing
- St. Ann's Bay
  - New Seville Plaque
  - Christopher Columbus Statue

=== Japan ===
- Shima, Mie
  - A reproduction of the Barcelona monument is found in the Shima Spanish Village.
- Urayasu, Chiba
  - A statue of Christopher Columbus is located at the American Waterfront section of Tokyo DisneySea.

=== Mexico ===
- Mexico City
  - Monument to Christopher Columbus (Charles Cordier), Paseo de la Reforma (1877)
  - Monument to Christopher Columbus (Buenavista, Mexico City), Buenavista (1892)

=== Nicaragua ===
- Managua
  - Cristóbal Colón (Christopher Columbus)

=== Panama ===
- Colón
  - Monumento a Cristóbal Colón (1867)

=== Paraguay ===
- Asunción
  - Busto de Cristóbal Colón (Bust of Columbus)

=== Peru ===
- Callao
  - Cristóbal Colón (Christopher Columbus)
- Cuzco
  - Placa conmemorativa de la resistencia andina (Plaque for Andean resistance) (1992)
- Lima
  - Monumento a Cristóbal Colón (Columbus Monument) (1867)
- Pisco
  - Cristóbal Colón (Christopher Columbus)
- Tacna
  - Cristóbal Colón (Christopher Columbus) (1892)

=== Portugal ===
- Cuba
  - Cristóvão Colombo (Christopher Columbus) (2006)
  - Cristóvão Colombo (Christopher Columbus) (2010)
- Funchal
  - Regata "América 500" (1992)
  - Cristóvão Colombo (Christopher Columbus) (1940)

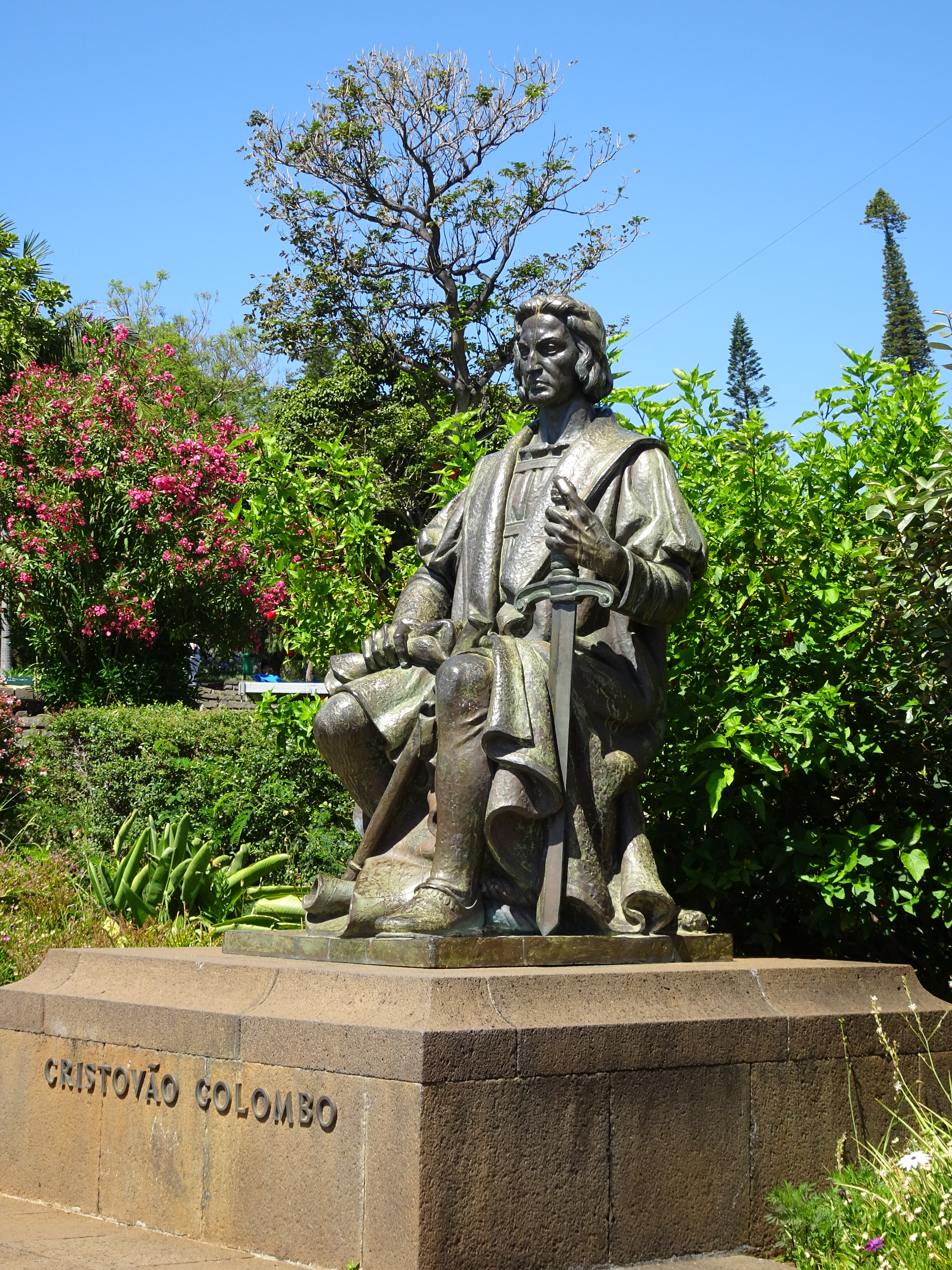
Columbus Monument in Santa Catarina Park, Funchal, Madeira

- Lisboa
  - Mural mostrando os Descobrimentos Português (Mural showing Portuguese Discoveries) (1994)
- Vila Baleira (Ilha do Porto Santo)
  - Cristóvão Colombo (Christopher Columbus) (1989)
- Vila do Porto
  - Cristóvão Colombo (Christopher Columbus) (1992)

==== Puerto Rico ====
- Arecibo
  - Nacimiento del Nuevo Mundo (Birth of the New World), a 268 feet (82 m) tall bronze and steel statue (2016).
- San Juan
  - Monumento a Colón, Plaza de Colón (1893)

=== Spain ===
- Alcalá de Henares
  - Monumento al Descubrimiento de América (Monument for the Discovery of America) (1986)
- Barcelona
  - Columbus Monument, Barcelona (1888). Called in Spanish “Mirador de Colón”, because it can be ascended internally to viewing windows. At the foot there are “various combinations of sculptures related to the discovery of America”.
- Cádiz
  - Placa conmemorativa del segundo viaje de Colón (Commemoration Plaque for Columbus 2nd voyage) (1993)
- Cartagena
  - Monumento a Colón, Muralla del Mar (1882)
- Córdoba
  - Cristobal Colón y los Reyes Católicos (Columbus with King Ferdinand and Queen Isabella)
- Granada
  - Monumento a Isabel la Católica y Cristóbal Colón, Gran Vía de Colón (1892)
- Huelva
  - Monument to the Discovery Faith, sculpted by Gertrude Vanderbilt Whitney and donated to Spain through the Columbus Memorial Foundation in 1929.
  - es:Monumento a Colón (Huelva) (2011)
- Jerez de los Caballeros
  - Monumento a Colón (1929)
- Las Palmas de Gran Canaria
  - Monumento a Colón, Alameda de Colón (1892)
  - Casa de Colón (1992)
- L'Arboç, Tarragona
  - There is a reproduction of the Barcelona monument (statue only) in mahogany wood, on top of building Les Amériques.
- Madrid
  - Monument to Columbus, 1881–1885
  - Monumento al Descubrimiento de América, Jardines del Descubrimiento (1977) (Monument for the Discovery of America, Discovery Gardens)
- Maspalomas, Gran Canaria
  - Reproduction of Barcelona monument (2006)
- Moguer
  - Monumento a Colón (2006)
- Palos de la Frontera
  - Monumento al Descubrimiento de América (1892–1893)
  - Estatua de Colón (2006)
- Playa de las Americas, Tenerife
  - Monumento a Colón
- Pontevedra
  - Monumento a Colón, Jardines de Colón (1892)
- Salamanca
  - Medallón de Colón (Columbus Medallion), Plaza Mayor (1733)
  - Monumento a Colón en Valcuevo (Valcuevo's Columbus Monument) (1866)
  - Monumento a Colón, Plaza de Colón (1893)
- San Antonio, Ibiza
  - Monumento al Descubrimiento de América (1992)
- San Fernando
  - Estatua de Colón (1895)
- San Sebastián de la Gomera
  - Busto de Colón (Bust of Columbus) (2006)
- Santa Fe
  - Monumento a Cristóbal Colón (1981)
- Sevilla
  - Tumba de Cristóbal Colón (Columbus' tomb) (1899)
  - Monumento a Cristóbal Colón (Columbus Monument) (1921)
  - Estatua de Cristóbal Colón en La Cartuja (Christopher Columbus in La Cartuja) (1887)
  - Birth of a New Man (1995)
- Valencia
  - Busto de Colón (1892)
- Valladolid
  - Monument to Columbus, Plaza de Colón (1905)
  - Casa Museo de Colón. Columbus house and place of death in 1506.

=== United Kingdom ===
- London
  - Statue of Christopher Columbus, Belgrave Square (1992)
- Liverpool
  - Statue of Christopher Columbus, Sefton Palm House, Liverpool

=== United States ===
==== Alabama ====
- Birmingham
  - Christopher Columbus Statue. Located at 10th Avenue South 1600.(Smolian International House).

==== Arizona ====
- Phoenix
  - Christopher Columbus Statue. Located at N. 12th St. 7509 (Arizona American Italian Club).

==== California ====
- Santa Barbara
  - Columbus Relief (1952) Located at Junipero Serra Hall.
- Los Angeles
  - Christopher Columbus Statue (1973) Located at Civic Center Mall.
  - Christopher Columbus Relief (1927–1932) Located at Hollywood Blvd. / N. Highland Ave (Hollywood First National Building).
- Chula Vista
  - Statue of Christopher Columbus (1990) Located at Discovery Park. Removed in 2019. Park renamed in 2022.
- San Francisco
  - Statue of Christopher Columbus (1957) Located at Telegraph Hill (in front of Coit Tower)
- San José
  - Christopher Columbus Statue (1958) Located at San Jose City Hall.
- Santa Ana
  - Christopher Columbus Monument Located at Bowers Museum.
- Roseville
  - Christopher Columbus Statue (1976) Located at Vernon St. at City Hall.

==== Colorado ====
- Denver
  - Statue of Christopher Columbus (1970) located at Civic Center Park (Promenade) damaged by protestors in 2020.
- Durango
  - Bust of Christopher Columbus located at Greenmount Cemetery
- Pueblo
  - Bust of Christopher Columbus (1905) located at East Abriendo Avenue

==== Connecticut ====
- Bridgeport
  - Statue of Christopher Columbus (1965) located at Seaside Park
- Hartford
  - Christopher Columbus Statue (1926) located at Columbus Green - Washington Street
- Meriden
  - Columbus Monument (1992) located at City Hall
- Middletown
  - Statue of Christopher Columbus, located at Columbus Point at Harbor Park
- Milford
  - Bust of Christopher Columbus (1992) located at West River Street 70 (Columbus Plaza)
- New Britain
  - Christopher Columbus Statue (1941) located at Columbus Park (Main & North streets)
- New Haven
  - Christopher Columbus Statue (1892, 1955) located at Wooster Square. Removed June 24, 2020.
- New London
  - Statue of Christopher Columbus (1928) located at Bank Street
- Norwalk
  - Christopher Columbus Statue (1940) located at Thomas O'Connor Park
- Norwich
  - Columbus Monument (1992) located at Broadway / Crescent Street
- Stamford
  - Christopher Columbus Statue (1960) located at Columbus Park
- Stamford
  - Columbus Marker (1992) located at Columbus Park
- Waterbury
  - Christopher Columbus Statue (1984) located at City Hall Plaza (Grand Street)
- Willimantic
  - Christopher Columbus Statue (1892) located at St. Joseph Church

==== Delaware ====
- Wilmington
  - Statue of Christopher Columbus, located at Columbus Square - Pennsylvania Avenue

==== District of Columbia ====
- Union Station
  - Columbus Fountain at Columbus Circle (1912)
- Washington D.C.
  - Christopher Columbus Statue (1992) located at 3rd & F Sts., NW (Holy Rosary Church)
  - Christopher Columbus Statue (1897) located at Library of Congress, Jefferson Building (Main Reading Room)

==== Florida ====
- Fort Lauderdale
  - Christopher Columbus Statue (1987) located at Port Everglades, Marinelli Gardens (Eller Drive)
- Miami
  - Statue of Christopher Columbus (1952, 1992) located at Bayfront Park
- Pensacola
  - Bust of Christopher Columbus (1992) located at City Hall in downtown Pensacola.
- Port Charlotte
  - Bust of Christopher Columbus (1993) located at 2500 Easy Street, St. Charles Borromeo Catholic Church
- Sarasota
  - Bust of Christopher Columbus located at Bay Shore Road 5401 (The John and Mable Ringling Museum of Art)
- Sarasota
  - Christopher Columbus Statue (1925) located at St. Armands Circle, St. Armand's key
- St. Petersburg
  - Christopher Columbus Statue (1960) located at Bayshore Dr. / 2nd Ave NE
- Tampa
  - Columbus Statue Park (1953). Located at Bayshore Boulevard at Platt Street Bridge

==== Georgia ====
- Columbus
  - Christopher Columbus Statue (1992) located on the Chattahoochee Riverwalk. Four-part memorial you can access at the entrance stairs leading from 10th street

==== Illinois ====
- Chicago
  - Christopher Columbus Statue (1892) located at South Chicago and Exchange Avenues, South Chicago, Chicago Temporarily removed by orders of Mayor Lori Lightfoot on July 31, 2020. At the time, it was the last known Columbus monument which wasn't removed.
  - Christopher Columbus Statue (1893) located in Arrigo Park. Removed on July 24, 2020.
  - Statue of Christopher Columbus (1933) located in Grant Park. Removed on July 24, 2020.
  - Christopher Columbus Statue located at Columbus Plaza in Arrigo Park, Little Italy, Chicago. Temporarily removed by orders of Mayor Lori Lightfoot on July 24, 2020.
- Kankakee
  - Christopher Columbus Memorial (1907) located at South Eighth Avenue / Water Street (Kankakee County Historical Society)
- Peoria
  - Christopher Columbus Statue (1902) located at Laura Bradley Park. Removed in October 2020.
- University Park
  - Columbus Bell Tower (1992) located at Governors State University

==== Iowa ====
- Des Moines
  - Bust of Christopher Columbus (1938) located at Capitol Grounds

==== Indiana ====
- Indianapolis
  - Bust of Christopher Columbus (1920) located at South West grounds of State Capitol Building
- Mishawaka
  - Christopher Columbus Statue located at E Mishawaka Avenue / Christyann Street (Central Park)
- Notre Dame
  - Murals depicting Columbus inside the Main Building of the University of Notre Dame, painted by Vatican artist Luigi Gregori between 1882 and 1884. These murals have been covered by removable tapestries since 2020, amid ongoing controversy over their depiction of Indigenous people.

==== Louisiana ====
- Baton Rouge
  - State of Christopher Columbus (1992) located at Government St. / River Rd. (Maritime Plaza)
- Columbia
  - Statues of Columbus and Washington (1916) located at Main Street 107
- New Orleans
  - Plaza de España Mural (1976, 2001) located near Canal St and Convention Center Blvd
- Shreveport
  - Christopher Columbus Statue (1897) located at Creswell Avenue 4747 (R. W. Norton Art Gallery)

==== Massachusetts ====
- Boston
  - Statue of Christopher Columbus (Beacon Hill, Boston)
  - Statue of Christopher Columbus (North End, Boston), Christopher Columbus Waterfront Park. Statue beheaded by protesters on June 10, 2020, and later removed.
- Chelsea
  - Statue of Christopher Columbus (1938) located at Dorothy M. Griffin Square
- Haverhill
  - Columbus Monument (1992) located at Columbus Park
- Middleton
  - Columbus Window located at St. Agnes Rectory
- Revere
  - Christopher Columbus Statue (1892) located at St Anthony of Padua Church
- Waltham
  - Columbus Monument (1992) located at Waltham Common
- Watertown
  - Columbus Delta Monument (1940) located at Main Street
- Worcester
  - Marble Christopher Columbus Statue (1978) located at Washington Square/Union Station

==== Maryland ====
- Baltimore
  - Columbus Obelisk (1792), located in Herring Run Park. Destroyed by vandals in 2017.
  - Christopher Columbus Monument (1984). Located at Eastern Ave & President Street adjacent to Little Italy, Baltimore. Pulled down by protesters on July 4, 2020, and thrown into Baltimore's inner harbor.
  - Christopher Columbus Statue (1892) located at Druid Hill Park
- Dundalk
  - Christopher Columbus Statue (2004) located at Eilers Avenue 2111 (Knights of Columbus)
- Ocean City
  - Christopher Columbus Monument (1985) located at Northside Park

==== Michigan ====
- Dearborn
  - Bust of Christopher Columbus (1975) located at Oakman Boulevard
- Detroit
  - Bust of Christopher Columbus (1910) located at Randolph Street
- Saginaw
  - Columbus Monument (1991) located in front of Saginaw County's government offices

==== Minnesota ====
- St. Paul
  - Statue of Christopher Columbus (1931) outside Minnesota State Capitol. Toppled by protesters during the George Floyd protests on June 10, 2020.

==== Missouri ====
- Kansas City
  - Lamppost commemorating Columbus (1992) located at Country Club Plaza
- St. Louis
  - Bust of Christopher Columbus (1855) located at University Boulevard 1 (Mercantile Library, Thomas Jefferson Library Building)
  - Statue of Christopher Columbus (1886) located at Tower Grove Park; removed June 16, 2020 following racial justice protests.

==== Montana ====
- Great Falls
  - Christopher Columbus Statue (1908) located at Mount Olivet Cemetery

==== Nebraska ====
- Columbus
  - The Quincentenary Belltower (1992) located at Pawnee Park

==== New Jersey ====
- Atlantic City
  - Christopher Columbus Statue located at Arkansas & Atlantic Avenue (Columbus Plaza)
- Bayonne
  - Bust of Christopher Columbus located at Mary Griffith Peters Sculpture Garden (Public Library & Cultural Center - 697 Avenue C)
- Camden
  - Statue of Christopher Columbus (1915) located at Farnham Park
- East Hanover
  - Bust of Christopher Columbus (1996)
- Elizabeth
  - Christopher Columbus Statue (1971) located at Third Avenue
- Ewing
  - Quincentennial tree with plaque (1992) located at Jake Garzio Drive 2
- Garfield
  - Christopher Columbus "The New World" Monument (1992, 1998) located at Dahnert Lake County Park
  - Columbus Memorial (1967) located at Columbus Park
- Hackensack
  - Bust of Christopher Columbus (1976) located at Columbus Park
- Hammonton
  - Bust of Christopher Columbus (1992) located at Egg Harbor Road, 1 block east of Route 54
- Hoboken
  - Christopher Columbus Statue (1937) located at Columbus Park
- Jersey City
  - La Vela di Colombo - The Sail of Columbus monument (1998) located at Liberty State Park
  - Christopher Columbus Statue (1950) located at Journal Square
- Kearny
  - Bust of Christopher Columbus (1967) located at Kearny Riverbank Park
- Lodi
  - Christopher Columbus Statue (1965) located at Memorial Drive 1 (Memorial Library)
  - Christopher Columbus Statue (1982) located at Christopher Columbus Park
- Long Branch
  - Christopher Columbus Statue (1961) located at Slocum Park - Broadway
- Lyndhurst
  - Columbus Monument (1970) located at Delafield Avenue
- Montville
  - Bust of Christopher Columbus (1999) located at Municipal Building
- Newark
  - Christopher Columbus Statue in Washington Park (1927) located at Washington Park
  - Christopher Columbus Statue in Xavier Park (1972) located at Bloomfield Avenue (Xavier Park)
- North Arlington
  - Christopher Columbus Statue (1992) located at River Road (Columbus Park)
- Nutley
  - Columbus Day Monument (1992) located at Chestnut Street / Kennedy Drive
  - Bust of Christopher Columbus (2000) located at Chestnut Street / Kennedy Drive
- Ocean Township
  - Relief with Columbus' fleet (1992) located near Monmouth Rd and Deal Rd
- Parsippany
  - Christopher Columbus Statue (1992) located at Parsippany Blvd.
- Passaic
  - Christopher Columbus Monument (1992) located at Passaic Avenue
- Paterson
  - Bust of Christopher Columbus (1953) located at Federici Park, Cianci Street & Curtis Place
- Pennsauken
  - Christopher Columbus Statue (1988) located at Cooper River Park
- Phillipsburg
  - Christopher Columbus Statue (1892) located at South Main & Stockton Streets (St. Philip & St James School)
- Ridgefield
  - Bust of Christopher Columbus (1975) located at Englehart Terrace (Edgewater Avenue & Shaler Boulevard)
- Scotch Plains
  - Christopher Columbus Monument (1998) located at 430 Park Ave. (Municipal Building)
- Secaucus
  - Bust of Christopher Columbus located at Paterson Plank Road & Humboldt Street
- Trenton
  - Christopher Columbus Statue (1959) located at Columbus Park (Hamilton Avenue)
- Union City
  - Bust of Christopher Columbus (1979) located at Ellsworth Park (24th St. & New York Ave.)
- West New York
  - Christopher Columbus Relief (1958) located at Christopher Columbus Park
- West Orange
  - Columbus Monument (1992) located at Valley Road
- Williamstown
  - Christopher Columbus Statue (1992) located at Main Street / Blue Bell Road

==== New York ====
- Harrison
  - Christopher Columbus Statue (1949, 1992) located at Broadway
- Huntington
  - Christopher Columbus Statue (1970, 1986, 1995) located at Columbus Plaza (W. Main Street and Lawrence Hill Rd.)
- Lackawanna
  - Bust of Christopher Columbus (1940) located at Bethlehem Park, Madison Ave.
- Lindenhurst
  - Columbus Monument (1991) 7-foot-tall monument
- Mahopac
  - Christopher Columbus Statue (1992) located at Thompson & McAlpin Streets (Town Hall)
- Mamaroneck
  - Columbus Relief (1936) located at Columbus Park
- Mineola
  - Christopher Columbus Statue located at the Courthouse in Mineola, NY
- Mount Kisco
  - Christopher Columbus Statue (1992) located at Village Center Park (Main St.)
- New Rochelle
  - Christopher Columbus Statue (2001) located at Hudson Park
- New York City, Manhattan
  - Columbus Monument, Columbus Circle (1892)
  - Statue of Christopher Columbus (Central Park)
  - Christopher Columbus as symbol for Genua (1907) located at Bowling Green, Manhattan (The U.S. Customs House)
  - Christopher Columbus in Queens (1941) located at Astoria Blvd, Queens
  - Columbus Bust in Bronx (1925) located at D'Auria-Murphy Triange, Bronx
  - Columbus decoration in station (1904) located at 59th Street-Columbus Circle (IRT West Side)
  - Hello Columbus! mural (1992) located at 8th Avenue (59th Street-Columbus Circle)
  - Christopher Columbus Statue (1867) located at Columbus Park, Cadman Plaza East, Brooklyn
- Newburgh
  - Christopher Columbus Statue (1992) located at Waterfront (Unico Park)
- Niagara Falls
  - Wall Mural (2000) located at Cristoforo Colombo Society
- Port Chester
  - Christopher Columbus Statue (1950) located at Columbus Park
- Poughkeepsie
  - Christopher Columbus Statue (1992) located at Columbus Drive / Mill Street
- Rochester
  - Bust of Christopher Columbus (1967) located at Exchange Blvd 99 (Rochester Civic Center, Hall of Justice)
- Schenectady
  - Christopher Columbus Quincentennial (1992) located at State Street
- Syracuse
  - Christopher Columbus Statue (1932) located at Columbus Circle
- Tarrytown
  - Christopher Columbus Statue (1963) located at Patriots' Park, North Broadway
- Utica
  - Christopher Columbus Statue (1952) located at Parkway, Parkway East and Mohawk Street
- White Plains
  - Christopher Columbus Statue (1915) located at N. Broadway
- Yonkers, New York
  - Bust of Christopher Columbus (1913) located at Park Hill Ave. (Columbus Park)
  - Statue decapitated in 2017.

==== Ohio ====
- Akron
  - Christopher Columbus Statue (1938) located at Triplett Boulevard (Akron Municipal Airport)
- Cleveland
  - Christopher Columbus Statue (1988) located at Mayfield Road 12015 (Holy Rosary Catholic School)
- Columbus, Ohio
  - Statue of Christopher Columbus (Columbus City Hall) (1955, removed in 2020)
  - Statue of Christopher Columbus (Columbus State Community College) (1959, removed in 2020)
  - Statue of Christopher Columbus (Ohio Statehouse) (c.1890–1892)
- Lorain City
  - Columbus Monument located at Meister Rd.
- Mayfield Heights
  - Christopher Columbus Statue (1988) located at Mayfield Road 5947 (Knights of Columbus)

==== Pennsylvania ====
- Bethlehem
  - Memorial to Admiral Christopher Columbus (1992). Removed in 2021.
- Bristol
  - Bust of Christopher Columbus (1992)
- Bryn Mawr
  - Bust of Christopher Columbus (1952)
- Carbondale
  - Bust of Christopher Columbus (1959)
- Chester
  - Christopher Columbus Statue (1955)
- Conshohocken
  - Bust of Christopher Columbus (1970)
- Easton
  - Christopher Columbus Statue (1930)
- Hazleton
  - Christopher Columbus Statue (1952)
- Lancaster
  - Bust of Christopher Columbus (1992)
- Norristown
  - Hello Columbus Monument (1992)
- Philadelphia
  - Christopher Columbus Marble Sculpture
  - Christopher Columbus Monument (1876)
  - Columbus Obelisk (1992)
  - Bust of Christopher Columbus (1920)
- Pittsburgh
  - Christopher Columbus Statue (1958)
- Pittston
  - Christopher Columbus Statue (1969)
- Scranton
  - Christopher Columbus Monument (1892)

==== Rhode Island ====
- Providence
  - Christopher Columbus Statue (1893), corner of Elmwood Avenue and Reservoir Avenue (removed in 2020)
- Newport
  - Christopher Columbus Statue (1953), intersection of Bellevue Avenue and Memorial Boulevard

==== Virginia ====
- Richmond
  - Statue of Christopher Columbus (Richmond, Virginia) (1927). Statue toppled, thrown into lake, recovered and put in storage June 10, 2020.

==== Washington State ====
- Walla Walla
  - Statue of Christopher Columbus (1911)

=== Uruguay ===
- Durazno
  - Monumento a Colón (Columbus Monument) (1892)
- Montevideo
  - Cristóbal Colón (Christopher Columbus) (1927)

=== Venezuela ===
- Caracas
  - Cristóbal Colón en el Parque El Calvario (Christopher Columbus in the El Calvario Park) (1893)
  - Monumento a Colón en el Golfo triste (Christopher Columbus in the Golfo Triste) (1904). This sculpture by Rafael de la Cova was torn down in 2004
- Carúpano
  - Cristóbal Colón (Christopher Columbus) (1892)
- Macuro
  - Cristóbal Colón (Christopher Columbus) (1974)
- Mérida
  - Busto de Cristóbal Colón (Bust of Columbus) (1895)
- Mucuchachí
  - Busto de Cristóbal Colón (Bust of Columbus) (1930?)

== Places ==
=== Canada ===
- British Columbia, province (1792)

=== South America ===
- Colombia and the earlier Greater Colombia, country of South America.
- Colón, Panama, city
- Colón (Panamanian province)
- Colombo (Brazilian municipality in the state of Paraná, Brazil)

=== Southeast Asia ===
- Colombo, former capital of Sri Lanka (altered by the Portuguese from similar-sounding native name)
- Colon Street, Cebu, Philippines

=== United States ===
At least 54 U.S. communities are named for Christopher Columbus.

- Columbia, Maryland, city
- Columbia, Missouri, city
- Columbia, South Carolina, city (1786)
- Columbus, Georgia, city
- Columbus, Indiana, city
- Columbus, Mississippi, city
- Columbus, Nebraska, city
- Columbus, Texas, city
- Columbus, Wisconsin, city
- Columbus, Montana
- Columbus, Ohio (1812)
- District of Columbia (1791)
- Columbiana County, Ohio
- Columbiana, Ohio, city
- Columbia County, New York
- Columbia County, Pennsylvania
- Columbia County, Wisconsin
- Columbus Circle, New York City

== Schools ==
=== United States ===
- Columbia University (1784)

== See also ==
- Monument and memorial controversies in the United States#Christopher Columbus (2017)
- Monument and memorial controversies in the United States#Murals of Columbus (2019)
- List of monuments and memorials removed during the George Floyd protests § Christopher Columbus
