= List of monuments and memorials removed during the George Floyd protests =

Removals of monuments and memorials in connection with the George Floyd protests

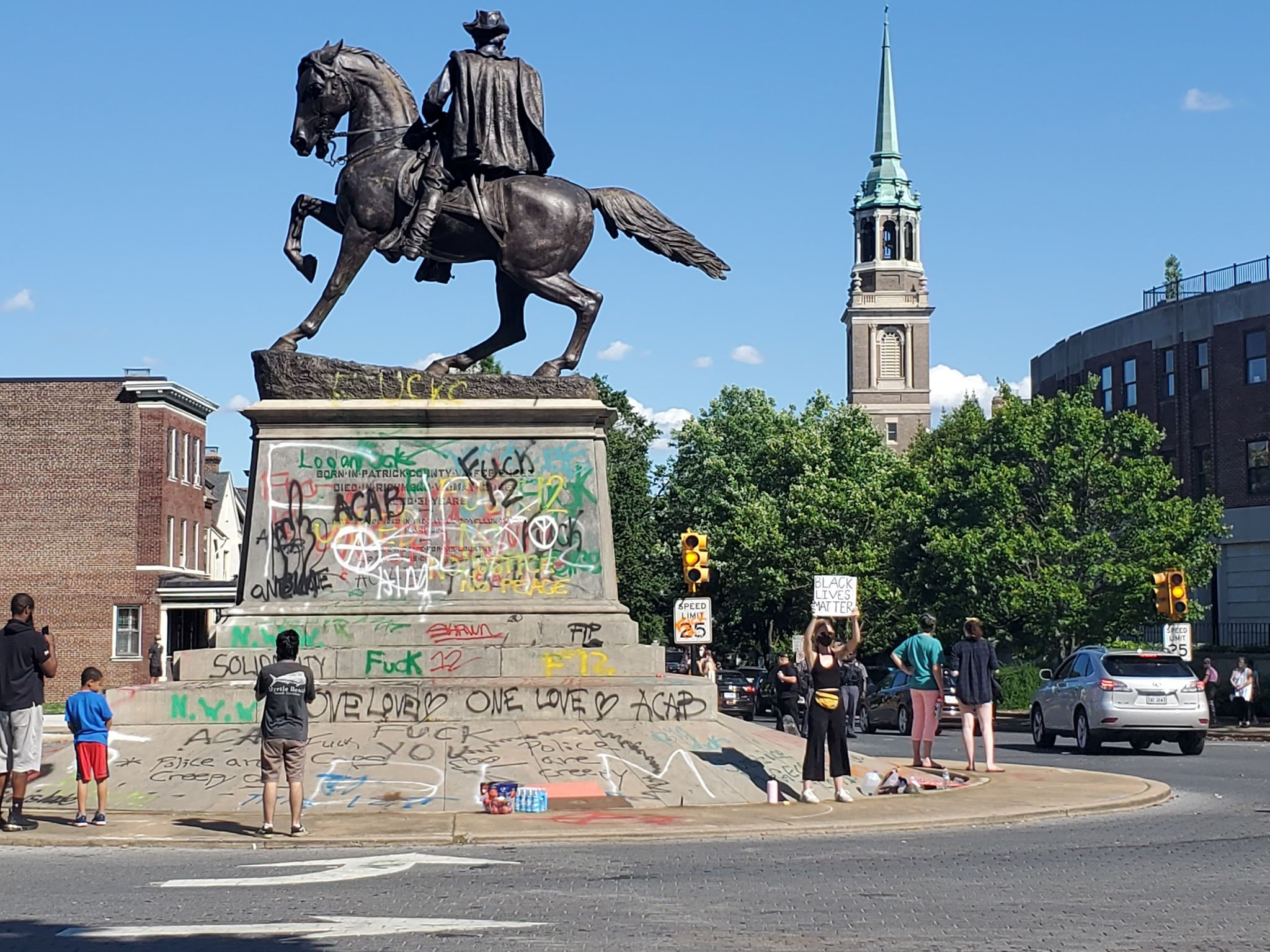
The J. E. B. Stuart Monument, defaced during protests in Richmond, Virginia, was removed on July 7, 2020.

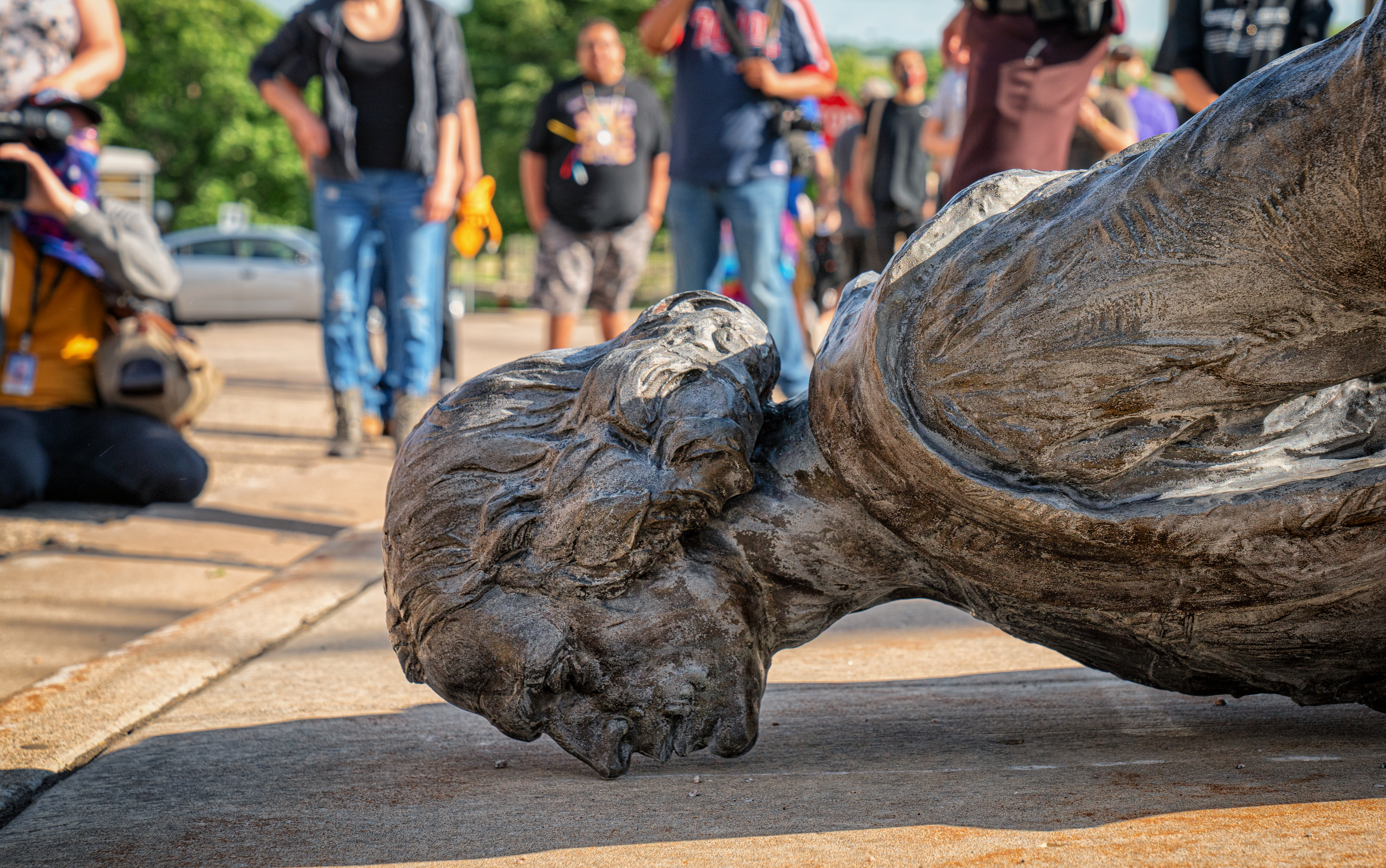
The statue of Christopher Columbus at the Minnesota State Capitol moments after it was pulled from its pedestal by American Indian Movement protesters.

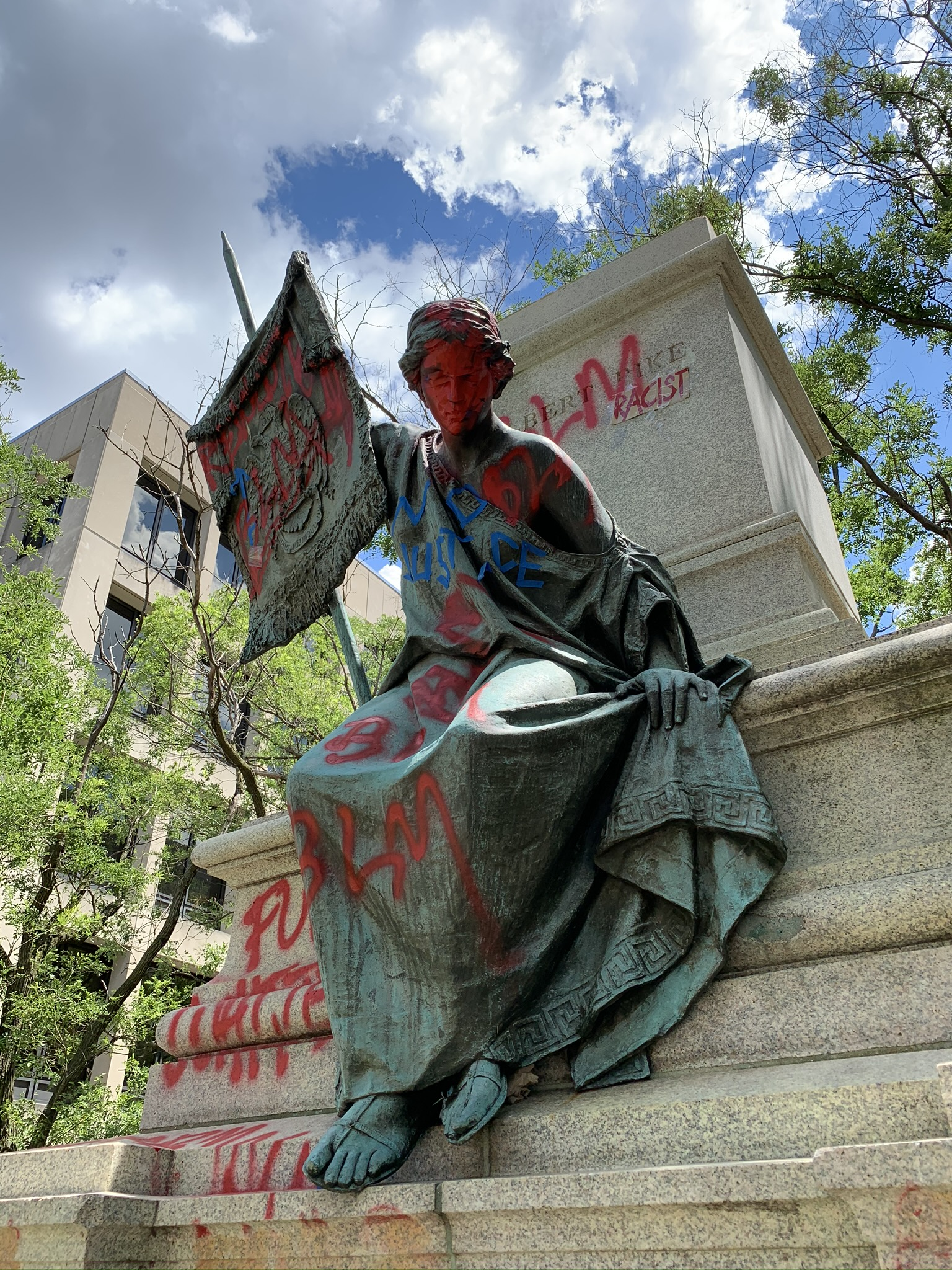
The Albert Pike Memorial in Washington, D.C., after protesters toppled the statue of Pike.

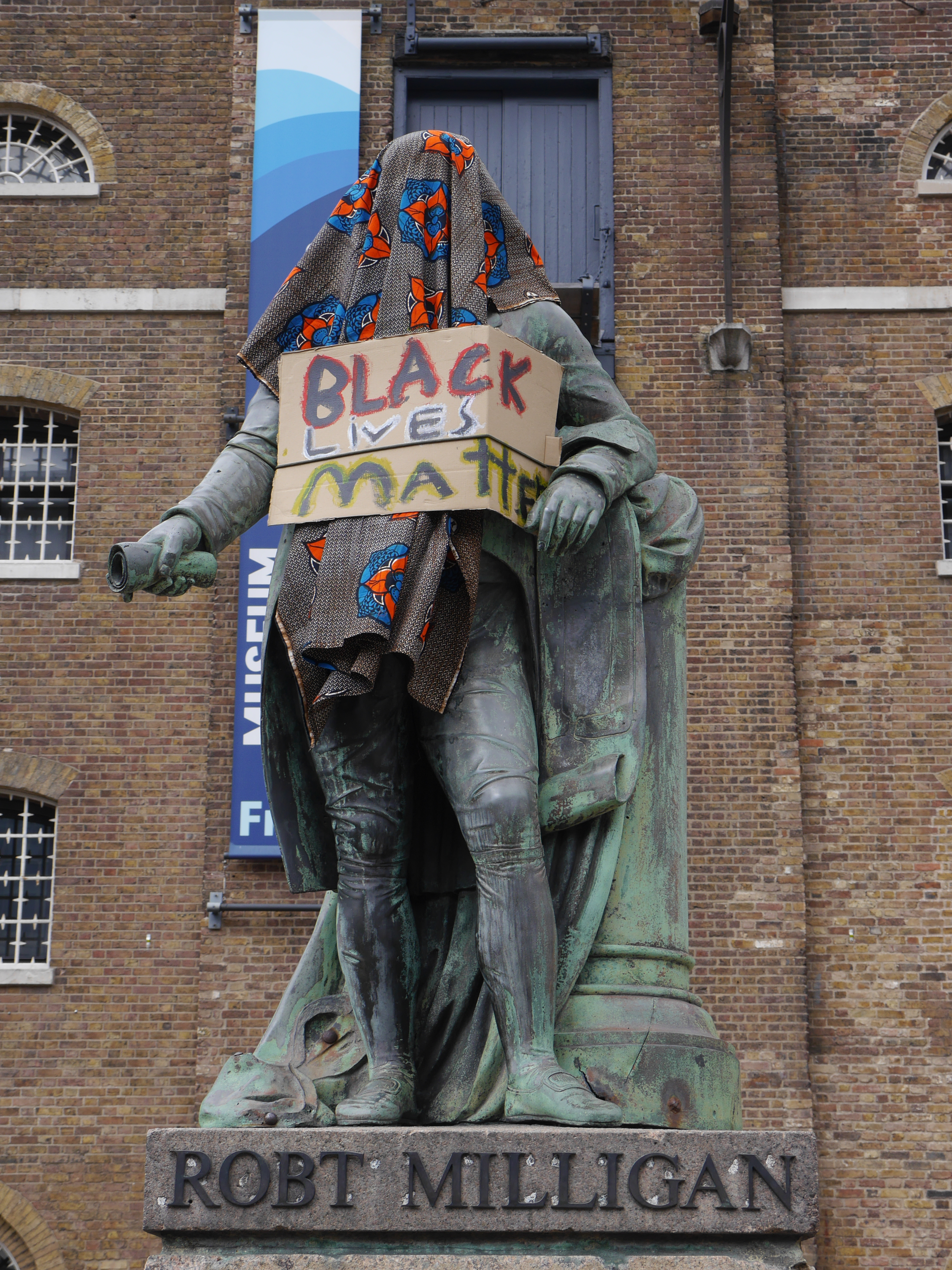
The vandalized statue of Robert Milligan outside the Museum of London Docklands before it was removed.

During the civil unrest that followed the murder of George Floyd in May 2020, a number of monuments and memorials associated with racial injustice were vandalized, destroyed or removed, or commitments to remove them were announced. This occurred mainly in the United States, but also in several other countries. Some of the monuments in question had been the subject of lengthy, years-long efforts to remove them, sometimes involving legislation and/or court proceedings. In some cases the removal was legal and official; in others, most notably in Alabama and North Carolina, laws prohibiting the removal of monuments were deliberately broken.

Initially, protesters targeted monuments related to the Confederate States of America. As the scope of the protests broadened to include other forms of systemic racism, many statues of other controversial figures such as Christopher Columbus, Junípero Serra, Juan de Oñate and Kit Carson were torn down or removed. Monuments to many other local figures connected with racism were also targeted by protestors.. Statues of American slave owners such as Thomas Jefferson, George Washington, Ulysses S. Grant, and Francis Scott Key were also vandalised or removed. According to the Huffington Post, by October 2020 over a hundred Confederate symbols had been "removed, relocated or renamed", based on data from the Southern Poverty Law Center.

Some monuments that were not associated with the Confederacy, slavery, or racism were also targeted. In Madison, Wisconsin, the statue of abolitionist Hans Christian Heg, was torn down and thrown into a lake. Protestors also tore down a statue titled Forward, by sculptor Jean Pond Miner, which depicts the embodiment of the Wisconsin state motto. In Portland, a statue of an elk was removed after several bonfires lit beneath the statue caused structural damage to the statue's base. A statue of York, a Black slave with the Lewis and Clark Expedition, was removed by the University of Portland after it was vandalised.

In the United Kingdom, removal efforts and vandalism focused on memorials to figures involved in the transatlantic slave trade, British colonialism, and eugenics. In Belgium, sculptures of King Leopold II were targeted due to his rule during the atrocities in the Congo Free State. In New Zealand, a statue of a British military officer John Hamilton was removed, and in India another colonial-era statue was relocated. In South Africa, a bust of Cecil Rhodes was decapitated, and a statue of the last president of the Orange Free State was taken down.

This list is limited to successful removals, and instances in which a person or body with authority has committed itself to removal. It does not include the many works that have been the subject of petitions, protests, defacement, or attempted removals, such as the Emancipation Memorial in Washington, D.C., and many statues of Leopold II in Belgium. It also does not include statues that fell or subject to attempted removals as a result of the Rhodes Must Fall movement that predates Floyd's murder by five years such as the statue of Cecil Rhodes at Oriel College, Oxford, England.

== Sculptures and other monuments ==
The following monuments and memorials were removed during the George Floyd protests, mainly due to their connections to racism. The majority are in the United States and mostly commemorate the Confederate States of America (CSA), but some monuments were also removed in other countries, for example the statues of slave traders in the United Kingdom.

Notes:

- The monument or memorial is scheduled to be removed but is still standing.
- The monument or memorial has been reinstated (not necessarily in the same location).
- Dates are in 2020 unless otherwise specified.

=== United States ===
The following monuments and memorials were removed during the George Floyd protests due to their association with racism in the United States. Most commemorated people involved in the Lost Cause of the Confederacy, with others linked to the genocide of Indigenous people, Racial segregation in the United States and also other related issues. In a few instances, like the Montgomery County Confederate Soldiers Monument and the statue of John Mason, the monuments had already been moved from their original location, sometimes more than once, as different venues objected.

==== Confederate monuments ====
The Confederate States of America fought a four-year war (the American Civil War) to preserve the institution of slavery. After its defeat, all enslaved African Americans were freed and became citizens with the same rights as whites. Confederate monuments commemorate politicians, Army officers, and soldiers of the Confederacy. Most are in the former CSA states.

This table does not include Virginia, which is in a second table that follows.

Monument/memorial		City	State, etc.	Removal announced	Removed	Means of removal	Notes	Ref.
Statue of Charles Linn		Birmingham	Alabama	—	May 31, 2020	Toppled by protesters	Toppled by protesters who unsuccessfully attempted to remove the nearby Confederate Soldiers and Sailors Monument.	
Confederate Soldiers and Sailors Monument		Birmingham	Alabama	May 31, 2020	Jun 1, 2020	Removed by city	The mayor said that the $25,000 fine for violating the Alabama Memorial Preservation Act was more affordable than the cost of continued unrest. The fine was paid by July 10.	
Bust of Robert E. Lee		Fort Myers	Florida	Jun 1, 2020	Jun 1, 2020	Removed by Sons of Confederate Veterans	Removed from downtown by its owner, the Sons of Confederate Veterans.	
Statue of Robert E. Lee at Robert E. Lee High School		Montgomery	Alabama	—	Jun 1, 2020	Toppled by protesters	Four people were charged with felony criminal mischief over removal of this statue.	
Bentonville Confederate Monument	Bentonville Confederate Monument	Bentonville	Arkansas	Jun 1, 2020	Sep 2, 2020	Plans for removal by United Daughters of the Confederacy	Removal announced during protests. Moved to the privately owned James H. Berry Park in July 2023 and the statue is now back in public view.	
Athens Confederate Monument	Athens Confederate Monument	Athens	Georgia	Jun 2, 2020	Aug 10, 2020	Removed by the city	The mayor and city commissioners announced plans to remove the monument.	
Nathan Bedford Forrest Monument	Nathan Bedford Forrest Monument	Rome	Georgia	-	Jan 29, 2021	Removed by the city		
Nash County Confederate Monument		Rocky Mount	North Carolina	Jun 2, 2020	Jun 30, 2020	Dismantled and placed in storage	The City Council of Rocky Mount voted to remove the monument.	
Confederate Soldiers and Sailors Monument	Confederate Soldiers and Sailors Monument	Indianapolis	Indiana	Jun 4, 2020	Jun 8, 2020	Removed by city	A resolution to remove the monument passed the Indianapolis Parks Board in 2017, but was not funded. The mayor announced it would be removed.	
Statue of Raphael Semmes	Statue of Raphael Semmes	Mobile	Alabama	Jun 5, 2020	Jun 5, 2020	Removed by city	Statue of Confederate Navy Admiral Raphael Semmes removed from downtown on orders of Mayor Sandy Stimpson. The $25,000 fine was paid by July 10.	
Statue of Sam Davis		Nashville	Tennessee	Jun 5, 2020	Jun 12, 2020	Removed by school	Statue of Confederate soldier Sam Davis removed from the campus of Montgomery Bell Academy.	
John B. Castleman Monument	John B. Castleman Monument	Louisville	Kentucky	Jun 8, 2020	Jun 8, 2020	Removed by city	Statue of John Breckinridge Castleman removed to be placed at his burial site at Cave Hill Cemetery.	
University of Alabama Confederate Memorial	Christopher Columbus statue	Tuscaloosa	Alabama		Jun 9, 2020	Removed by University.	The memorial was formerly located near the Gorgas Library. Three Confederate plaques were also removed from the university grounds.	
Jacksonville Confederate Monument	Jacksonville Confederate Monument	Jacksonville	Florida	Jun 9, 2020	Jun 9, 2020	Removed by city	Overnight removed the monument from a Confederate monument in Hemming Park, leaving an empty pedestal.	
Denton Confederate Soldier Monument	Denton Confederate Soldier Memorial	Denton	Texas	Jun 9, 2020	Jun 25, 2020	Removed by county	Denton County commissioners voted to remove and relocate the monument.	
The Grandstand Confederate Memorial Services		Jacksonville	Florida	Jun 9, 2020	—	Plans for removal by city	Mayor announced removal of all Confederate monuments, memorials, and markers, including this in Old City Cemetery.	
Confederate Monument	Monument to Confederate war soldiers	Fort Worth	Texas	Jun 9, 2020	Jun 13, 2020	Removed by Tarrant County	County commission voted to remove the monument in front of Tarrant County Courthouse.	
Florida's Tribute to the Women of the Confederacy	Monument to the Women of the Southland	Jacksonville	Florida	Jun 9, 2020	Dec 27, 2023	Removed by order of Mayor Donna Deegan	Mayor announced removal of all Confederate monuments, memorials, and markers, including this one in Confederate Park, since renamed Springfield Park.	
Multiple historic markers		Jacksonville	Florida	Jun 10, 2020	—	Plans for removal by Mayor Lenny Curry	Announced plans to remove all Confederate monuments including these 8 items: Maple Leaf at Northbank Riverwalk, Maple Leaf at Walter Jones Historical Park, Florida Confederate Soldiers and Sailors Home marker in Old City Cemetery, Line of Entrenchment at old Jacksonville Terminal, Skirmish At Cedar Creek at Lenox Avenue, 1914 United Confederate Veterans Reunion at Confederate Park (now Springfield Park), 23 informational signs and 58 tree signs at Camp Milton Historic Preserve, and In Memory of Our Beloved Ancestors – Ground Marker at Old City Cemetery.	
Confederate Soldier Memorial	Confederate Soldier Memorial	Huntsville	Alabama	Jun 10, 2020	Oct 23, 2020	Removal authorized by unanimous vote of Madison County Commission. State review committee said they did not have legal authority to authorize removal; referred to Alabama Attorney General. Activists have raised $25,000 to pay the fine, if removed illegally.	The memorial, constructed in 1905, was located in front of the Madison County Courthouse. The county would be fined $25,000 if it removed the memorial without state approval under a 2017 law designed to protect historical structures and monuments. The statue, which was owned by the United Daughters of the Confederacy, was gradually removed on October 23, 2020.	
Gloria Victis	Gloria Victis	Salisbury	North Carolina	Jun 11, 2020	Jul 6–7, 2020	Two unanimous votes by city council, plus police chief declared it a risk to public safety	June 20, UDC signed the city's proposal to have the sculpture moved to Old Lutheran Cemetery.	
Spirit of the Confederacy	Spirit of the Confederacy	Houston	Texas	Jun 11, 2020	Jun 17, 2020	Removed by city	To be moved to the Houston Museum of African American Culture.	
Statue of Richard W. Dowling	Statue of Richard W. Dowling	Houston	Texas	Jun 11, 2020	Jun 17, 2020	Removed by city, disassembled and placed in storage	Initial plans to relocate the statue of Dick Dowling to Sabine Pass Battleground State Historic Site were scuttled following objections by the mayor of Port Arthur. Final disposition uncertain.	
Gadsden Confederate Memorial	Gadsden Confederate Memorial	Quincy	Florida	Jun 11, 2020	Jun 11, 2020	Crane to remove it appeared 30 minutes after county commissioners' unanimous vote.	Removed from the front of the Gadsden County Courthouse. Will be relocated within six months.	
Confederate War Memorial	The Confederate War Memorial in 2006	Dallas	Texas	Jun 12, 2020	Jun 24, 2020	Removed by city	Placed in storage to prevent protester injuries during potential vandalism attempts, pending resolution of preexisting legal dispute over disposition.	
DeKalb County Confederate Monument	DeKalb County Confederate Monument	Decatur	Georgia	Jun 12, 2020	Jun 18, 2020	Monument removal ordered by Georgia Superior Court Justice	The monument was ordered removed by Superior Court Justice Clarence Seeliger on the grounds that it constituted a public nuisance under the Georgia code.	
Statue of Jefferson Davis		Frankfort	Kentucky	Jun 12, 2020	Jun 13, 2020	Removed by state	The Historic Properties Advisory Commission voted to move the statue from the capitol rotunda to the Jefferson Davis State Historic Site. Removed the following day.	
Stand Watie and Confederate Soldier Fountain		Tahlequah	Oklahoma	Jun 13, 2020	Jun 13, 2020	Removed by Cherokee Nation	Watie headed the Confederate-allied Cherokee. The fountain was dedicated in 1913 by the Daughters of the Confederacy rather than the Cherokee Nation.	
Stand Watie Monument		Tahlequah	Oklahoma	Jun 13, 2020	Jun 13, 2020	Removed by Cherokee Nation	The monument was dedicated in 1921 by the Daughters of the Confederacy rather than the Cherokee Nation.	
Pitt County Confederate Soldiers Monument		Greenville	North Carolina	June 15, 2020	June 22, 2020	Removed by county	County, which owns the statue, voted to remove immediately under "reason of threatened public safety".	
Washington County, Mississippi Confederate Monument		Greenville	Mississippi	June 16			County commission voted 4–1 to move the monument from its position in front of courthouse.	
Iberville Parish Confederate Monument		Plaquemine	Louisiana	June 16			Parish Council voted unanimously for removal.	
Zebulon Baird Vance Monument		Asheville	North Carolina	June 16	Started May 18, 2021	Asheville City Council and Buncombe County Council	City and County councils both unanimously passed a joint-resolution to remove monument.	
Montgomery County Confederate Soldiers Monument		White's Ferry, Dickerson	Maryland		June 16	Removed by private owner, who also renamed Gen. Jubal A. Early ferry boat.	Until 2017, had stood in front of the Montgomery County courthouse in Rockville, Maryland.	
Hey Reb!		Las Vegas	Nevada	June 16	June 16	Removed by the University of Nevada, Las Vegas	The statue is a representation of Hey Reb!, the mascot of the UNLV Rebels. It was donated to the university in 2007 and was situated outside the Richard Tam Alumni Center before its removal.	
Monument to 60th Regiment NC Volunteers and Battle of Chickamauga		Asheville	North Carolina	June 17	July 14	Removed by Buncombe County Commission	Formerly located in front of the county courthouse.	
Robert E. Lee Dixie Highway, Colonel John Connally Marker		Asheville	North Carolina	June 17	July 10	Removed jointly Buncombe County Commission and City of Asheville	Placed in storage. Base left for any future use of the site.	
Confederate Cow Cavalry Monument		Plant City	Florida	June 18	June 11 (one week before announcement)	Removed by city council, placed in storage	Monument to 1st Florida Special Cavalry Battalion also known as the "Cow Cavalry" due to them protecting farmlands during the war. Monument was placed by United Daughters of the Confederacy in 2007 on public land without city approval. City requesting UDC to retrieve monument from storage.	
Jefferson Davis Memorial Boulder		Brownsville	Texas		June 17	Removed by city	Removed from Washington Park.	
Robert E. Lee Highway Marker		San Diego	California		June 18	Removed by San Diego Parks and Recreation and Stockdale Capital Partners	The marker was located in the Horton Plaza Park prior to its removal.	
Memorial to Company A, Capitol Guards	Memorial to Company A, Capitol Guards	Little Rock	Arkansas		June 18	Removed by city	The statue will be placed in storage until a location can be found for it.	
North Carolina State Confederate Monument	North Carolina State Confederate Monument	Raleigh	North Carolina	June 19	June 19	Two statues toppled by protesters; remainder removed by work crew	Protesters pulled down the two statues at the base of the monument, dragging one through the streets and hanging it from a street light. Removal of remainder ordered by Governor Roy Cooper shortly afterward.	
Albert Pike Memorial	The statue of Albert Pike	Washington	District of Columbia		June 19	Toppled and set afire by protesters during Juneteenth. Later repaired and restored.	The statue was wrapped in chains before it was toppled. The D.C. government wanted to remove the work in 2017, but could not do so without an act of Congress. The statue was repaired and reinstalled by the NPS on President Trump's orders in October 2025.	
Pine Bluff Confederate Monument	The Pine Bluff Confederate Monument	Pine Bluff	Arkansas	June 20	June 20	County judge and United Daughters of the Confederacy	The statue was removed from the Jefferson County Courthouse as part of a cooperative agreement between Jefferson County Judge Gerald Robinson and the United Daughters of the Confederacy. The statue was transferred to an undisclosed location where it can be cleaned and repaired	
Statue of Henry Lawson Wyatt		Raleigh	North Carolina	—	June 21	Removed by governor's order	Removal ordered by Governor Roy Cooper after protesters removed statues at base of Confederate Monument.	
Monument to North Carolina Women of the Confederacy (Note: Also known as the "Daughters of the Confederacy Monument".)		Raleigh	North Carolina	—	June 21	Removed by governor's order	Removal ordered by Governor Roy Cooper after protesters removed statues at base of Confederate Monument.	
Confederate Soldiers' Memorial Bridge sign and statue		Clarksville	Tennessee		Week of June 15	Removed by city	The sign and monument were allegedly removed for their own protection.	
Confederate soldier grave marker		Silver Spring	Maryland		June 17	Toppled by protesters	The statue was located at Grace Episcopal Church. It marked the remains of seventeen unidentified Confederate soldiers killed during the Battle of Fort Stevens.	
Confederate Monument		Oxford	Mississippi	June 18	July 14	Relocated by University of Mississippi	The statue was previously located in front of the university's main administration building. It was the site of a pro-segregation riot in 1962 and a pro-Confederate protest in 2019. The statue was previously vandalized by protesters. It will be moved to a Confederate cemetery on campus.	
Confederate Memorial Obelisk		St. Augustine	Florida	June 22		City commissioners voted 3–2 on June 22, 2020, to move the obelisk.		
"To our Confederate dead" monument	Confederate Monument	Louisburg	North Carolina	June 22	June 29	Removed by city	Louisburg Town Council voted to move the monument to Oakwood Cemetery.	
Leflore County Confederate Monument		Greenwood	Mississippi	June 23			County commission voted unanimously to move monument from in front of courthouse.	
Our Confederate Soldiers		Beaumont	Texas	June 23	June 29		City Council of Beaumont voted to remove it.	
Warren County Confederate Soldiers Monument		Warrenton	North Carolina	June 23	June 24	Removed by county, placed in storage	County commissioners unanimously voted to remove monument	
The Granville Gray		Oxford	North Carolina	June 24	June 24	Removed by county, placed in storage	Granville County commissioners voted to remove monument after threats were made to topple monument. County announced that they would vote later on where to relocate monument	
Judah Benjamin marker		Charlotte	North Carolina		June 24	Removed by city	The marker consisted of black granite and located near a sidewalk. It was paid for by a local synagogue in the late 1940s. A local branch of the Daughters of the Confederacy initially proposed placing the marker, but they ceased support after being told not to work with Jews by a New York banker.	
Lenoir County Confederate Monument		Kinston	North Carolina	June 25	July 1	Removed by Lenoir County Board of Commissioners	The statue was relocated from the Lenoir County visitor center to the First Battle of Kinston Civil War Battlefield Park. This the fifth time the statue has been moved.	
Confederate Memorial	Confederate Memorial	Wilmington	North Carolina	Not announced	June 25	Temporarily removed by city		
George Davis Monument	George Davis Monument	Wilmington	North Carolina	Not announced	June 25	Temporarily removed by city	Davis was a Confederate senator and Attorney General.	
Confederate Memorial		Minden	Louisiana	Not announced	June 26	Removed by owner, United Daughters of the Confederacy		
Confederate Monument	Confederate Monument	Fayetteville	North Carolina	Not announced	June 27	Removed by owner, United Daughters of the Confederacy		
Monument to Confederate Dead (Haymount area)		Fayetteville	North Carolina	Not announced	June 27	Removed by owners, Sons of Confederate Veterans and United Daughters of the Confederacy		
Lowndes County, Alabama, Confederate Monument		Hayneville	Alabama	June 29	July 1	Removed by county	The memorial was located near the Lowndes County Courthouse. The county was fined under the Alabama Memorial Preservation Act.	
Kanawha Riflemen memorial		Charleston	West Virginia	June 29	June 29	Removed by city	The monument consisted of a standing commemorative plaque connected to two stone benches; the benches were not removed.	
Statue of Confederate soldier		Frederick	Maryland		June 29 (discovered)	Toppled and beheaded; not likely to be repaired		
Rockdale County Confederate Monument	Rockdale County Confederate Monument	Conyers	Georgia		June 30	Removed by Rockdale County Commission		
Confederate Monument		Orangeburg	South Carolina	June 30, 2020		Removal requires a 2/3 vote of the South Carolina Legislature.	Orangeville City Council voted unanimously for removal.	
Confederate Monument (Cross Creek Cemetery)		Fayetteville	North Carolina	—	June 30, 2020	Removed by owner	The oldest Confederate monument in North Carolina.	
Slave whipping post		Georgetown	Delaware	June 29	July 1	Removed by state		
Statue of Alfred Mouton 1922		Lafayette	Louisiana	Jul 1, 2020	Jul 17, 2021	Removed by city	On July 16, 2021, the United Daughters of the Confederacy signed a settlement agreeing that the city would bear the cost for removing the statue, which stood outside the former city hall, to another location. It was removed the next day.	
Two statues commemorating specific events		McConnellsburg	Pennsylvania	July 2			The first statue is a historical marker commemorating a skirmish that killed two Confederate soldiers separated from their unit. The second memorial commemorates a meal given to Confederate soldiers by McConnellsburg residents after the 1864 burning of Chambersburg. Two historical markers, noting the same events, were also removed.	
Mt. Zion Confederate Monument		Cornelius	North Carolina	July 2		Church Board asked for its removal		
Monument to Confederate Brigadier General Albert G. Jenkins		Hampden Township	Pennsylvania		July 3 (confirmed)	Removed by owner of land		
Statue of Benjamin Welch Owens		Lothian	Maryland		July 3 (discovered)	Toppled by protesters	The statue was also vandalized in June.	
United Confederate Veterans Memorial		Seattle	Washington	—	July 3/4	Toppled by protesters	The monument was toppled by unknown persons, apparently on July 3, 2020. In the process, the lower ends of both formerly vertical columns were broken in multiple places.	
Judah P. Benjamin Monument		Sarasota	Florida	Mid-June	July 5	Removed by city manager	Removed along with a marker dedicated to Benjamin.	
Cape Girardeau Confederate Memorial	Cape Girardeau Confederate Memorial	Cape Girardeau	Missouri	August 20		Removed by city council		
Bolivar County Confederate Monument		Cleveland	Mississippi	July 6		County Commissioners voted unanimously to relocate the statue		
Lowndes County, Mississippi, Confederate soldier		Columbus	Mississippi	July 6		County Commissioners voted unanimously to relocate the statue.		
Greensboro Confederate Statue (Green Hill Cemetery)		Greensboro	North Carolina	July 6	July 7	Toppled by protesters; moved to storage		
Lee Square Confederate Monument		Pensacola	Florida	July 7		The City of Pensacola is calling for its removal. Lee Square may also be renamed Florida Square.	The monument was vandalized with red paint on the night of June 29. Removal of monument began on October 26 with the removal of the 42 ft. monument's 8 ft. statue portion.	
Henry County Confederate Monument		McDonough	Georgia	July 7	July 29	Removed by county commissions	Disassembled, base still remains currently	
Anson County Courthouse Confederate monument		Wadesboro	North Carolina	July 7	July 8	Removed by county		
Marker of Jefferson Davis Highway		Hwy. 99 near Bakersfield	California	July 8	June 17 (three weeks before announcement)	Moved by county to storage area at Kern County Museum		
Statue of Henry Watkins Allen		Port Allen	Louisiana	July 8		The Port Allen City Council has requested that West Baton Rouge Parish remove the statue.		
Bust of Nathan Bedford Forrest Loura Jane Herndon Baxendale, 1978		Nashville	Tennessee	Jul 9, 2020	Jul 23, 2021	Tennessee Capital Commission voted to relocate bust	Relocated to Tennessee State Museum	
Bust of Charles Didier Dreux		New Orleans	Louisiana		July 10	Toppled by protesters; city has not announced plans for the statue	Bust commemorating Confederate officer Charles Didier Dreux. The nose had previously been chiseled off the statue by protesters.	
David O. Dodd memorial bench and historical marker		Little Rock	Arkansas	July 10	July 9 or 10	Removed by city	The two structures were previously located in MacArthur Park. They honored Dodd, a 17 year-old executed by the Union for spying for the Confederacy.	
1929 Confederate Reunion Marker		Charlotte	North Carolina	—	July 10	Removed at direction of county commissioner, placed in storage	Marker commemorated a reunion with confederate veterans in 1929. Marker has previously been vandalized in recent years and had glass enclosure placed around it to protect it. Glass case left empty.	
Sampson County Confederate Monument		Clinton	North Carolina	Not announced	July 11	Damaged by protesters after the city council passed a resolution asking the county to remove it		
Pasquotank County Confederate Monument		Elizabeth City	North Carolina	July 13		Removal ordered by county		
Leonard Park Confederate Monument		Gainesville	Texas	July 14		Unanimous vote of city council	Plan to relocate monument to Grayson County Frontier Village historical site in Denison, Texas.	
Madison County Confederate Monument		Madison	Florida	July 14		Black County Commissioners voted for removal, white ones to leave it.		
Confederate soldier memorial		Macon	Georgia	July 14		The City is moving it, but how to pay for the substantial cost is unresolved. It will be relocated to Whittle Park.	On the site of a former slave market. In a second phase of statue removal, the County's Women of the South memorial may be moved.	
Caddo Parish Confederate Monument		Shreveport	Louisiana	July 20		Parish commission and UDC agreed to move monument to different location, pending agreement on new location	Parish to build wooden box around monument to protect and cover structure before its relocation	
Memorial to Arizona Confederate troops		Phoenix	Arizona	July 22	July 23	Removed by UDC overnight	UDC requested to take back monument from public property and find new location on private property	
Jefferson Davis Memorial Highway marker		Gold Canyon	Arizona	July 22	July 23	Removed by UDC overnight	UDC requested to take back monument from public property and find new location on private property	
Caldwell County Confederate Monument		Lockhart	Texas	July 28		County commission approved removal	Plans to relocate statue to Caldwell County Museum	
Gaston County Confederate Monument		Gastonia	North Carolina	August 4		County commission voted to relocate statue	Monument currently in front of courthouse. SCV has 6 months to submit a proposal for the monument's new location	
Daviess County Confederate Monument		Owensboro	Kentucky	August 6		County Fiscal Court voted to relocate monument	Fiscal Court set up a relocation committee to plan for the removal and find a new location. Monument currently in front of the courthouse.	
Monument to William Wing Loring		St. Augustine	Florida	Not announced	Night of August 23–24	Removed by University of Florida, which owns the land it was on.	Loring was a Confederate general.	
Historic marker states that under the Confederacy, Bowling Green was the capital of Kentucky		Bowling Green	Kentucky	Not announced	c. August 25	Removed by Western Kentucky University administration.	Frankfort remained the Union capital and controlled much more of Kentucky than the shadow Confederate government of Kentucky.	
Putnam County Confederate Memorial		Palatka	Florida	August 25			In November 2020, the board decided that the statue would be relocated to Putnam County Veterans Memorial Park but only if $200,000 in private funds was raised within 90 days from people inside of Putnam County.	
The South's Defenders		Lake Charles	Louisiana	August 27		Calcasieu Parish Police Jury voted 10–4 to keep monument	Two weeks after the vote, Hurricane Laura knocked the monument's statue off its base.	
John Pelham Monument		Anniston	Alabama	early September	September 27	In September 2020, the Anniston, Alabama city council voted 4–1 to remove a monument of Confederate artillery officer John Pelham located in the grassy median of a major public avenue in Anniston since 1905. Anniston Mayor Jack Draper previously called for its removal in June 2020	On September 27, construction workers successfully removed the stone obelisk monument late in the evening. However, there were still plans to relocate it to a Confederate history park.	
Stonewall Jackson Monument		San Diego	California	July 23	July 23	Removed at the request of the United Daughters of the Confederacy.	Confederate monument removed from plot in city-owned cemetery where Union and Confederate soldiers are buried. Monument has been the target of petitions for removal since 2017.	
Uptown Square Confederate Monument		Lexington	North Carolina	October 14	October 16	Removed at the request of the United Daughters of the Confederacy.	Despite objections from Davidson County Commissioners, the Confederate monument which stood at the city square in Lexington since 1902 was removed after the Davidson County Superior Court allowed for the city and the Daughters of the Confederacy to have it removed from this location. The statue would be removed from the city square late at night for an almost five-hour period on October 15–16.	
Statue of Robert E. Lee		Washington	District of Columbia		Dec 21, 2020	Removed by staff from the Architect of the Capitol	The statue, formerly one of Virginia's two contributions to the National Statuary Hall at the United States Capitol rotunda, will be moved to the Virginia Museum of History & Culture. Virginia Governor Ralph Northam filed a request for a bill to remove the statue in December 2020.	

===== Virginia =====
Virginia, where the CSA had its capital in Richmond, has the most Confederate monuments of any U.S. state. A March 2020 change in the law of Virginia had already essentially repealed the statute preventing removal of historical monuments, effective from July 1, 2020. This change became possible when voters, after electing the Democrat Ralph Northam as Governor in 2017, gave the Democrats control of both houses of the Virginia General Assembly from January 2020, for the first time in a generation.

Monument/memorial		City	State	Removal announced	Removed	Means of removal	Notes	Ref.
Appomattox	Appomattox statue	Alexandria	Virginia	—	May 31, 2020	Removed by United Daughters of the Confederacy	The owner, United Daughters of the Confederacy, moved the date up because of the protests.	
Norfolk Confederate Monument	Norfolk Confederate Monument	Norfolk	Virginia	June 2, 2020	June 16, 2020	Removed by city	City Council approved removal; located at a former slave auction site. Johnny Reb statue atop the monument removed June 12; rest of monument removed by June 16.	
Robert E. Lee Monument	Robert E. Lee Monument	Richmond	Virginia	June 3, 2020	September 8, 2021	Removed by state	Governor announced removal "as soon as possible"; monument on state land.	
J. E. B. Stuart Monument	J. E. B. Stuart Monument	Richmond	Virginia	June 3, 2020	July 7, 2020	Removed by City of Richmond	Planned removal of the four Confederate monuments on city land. After the J. E. B. Stuart statue was removed, the Robert E. Lee statue became the last remaining Confederate monument located on Richmond's Monument Avenue.	
Stonewall Jackson Monument	Stonewall Jackson Monument	Richmond	Virginia	June 3, 2020	July 1, 2020	Removed by City of Richmond	Planned removal of the four Confederate monuments on city land.	
Matthew Fontaine Maury Monument	Matthew Fontaine Maury Monument	Richmond	Virginia	June 3, 2020	July 2, 2020	Removed by City of Richmond	One of the four Confederate monuments on city land.	
Slave Auction Block	Slave auction block	Fredericksburg	Virginia	2019	June 5, 2020	Removed by city	A slave auction block was removed from the downtown and will be displayed in the Fredericksburg Area Museum.	
Robert E. Lee Memorial		Roanoke	Virginia	June 5, 2020	July 23, 2020	Toppled and damaged by protester, city removed monument afterwards	City Council had voted earlier to start the legal process to remove the monument and rename Lee Plaza. City will keep monument in storage until fate of statue is determined	
Statue of Williams Carter Wickham	Statue of Williams Carter Wickham	Richmond	Virginia	—	June 6, 2020	Toppled by protesters	Pulled from its base and tumbled to the ground.	
Jefferson Davis Memorial	Jefferson Davis Memorial	Richmond	Virginia	June 3, 2020	June 10, 2020	Statue of Davis toppled by protesters; the rest of the memorial was not damaged	Planned removal of the four Confederate monuments on city land. Protesters toppled the statue from its plinth on June 10.	
Confederate Monument		Portsmouth	Virginia	June 9, 2020	June 10, 2020	Four statues decapitated and one pulled down by protesters	City campaign to remove it already underway.	
Plaques and stained-glass windows at St. Paul's Episcopal Church		Richmond	Virginia	June 14, 2020		Removal approved by vestry of seven plaques 'associated with the Lost Cause era and ideology' and rededicate the stained-glass windows installed as memorials to Robert E. Lee, Jefferson Davis, and their families	This is the church Lee and Davis attended in Richmond; Jefferson Davis was a member. The windows and plaques contain no battle flags or Confederate imagery.	
Howitzer Monument		Richmond	Virginia	June 16, 2020	June 16, 2020	Toppled by protesters	Pulled off its pedestal by a rope. Was located near Virginia Commonwealth University's Monroe Park campus.	
Loudoun County Courthouse Confederate monument		Leesburg	Virginia	June 26, 2020	July 21, 2020	Removed overnight by UDC	County had voted to remove monument	
Confederate Soldiers and Sailors Monument		Richmond	Virginia	July 1, 2020	July 8, 2020	Removed by city	The sixth city-owned Confederate monument ordered removed by Richmond Mayor Levar Stoney on July 1.	
Two Confederate cannons		Richmond	Virginia		July 2, 2020	Removed by city	One of the cannons was located near the Arthur Ashe memorial; its plaque claimed that the cannon marked the second line of the Confederate defense of Richmond. The second cannon was located near the Jefferson Davis memorial.	
Fitzhugh Lee cross		Richmond	Virginia		July 9, 2020	Removed by city	Fitzhugh served as a Major General in the Confederate Army and later as the governor of Virginia.	
Statue of Joseph Bryan		Richmond	Virginia		July 9, 2020	Removed by city	Bryan owned the Richmond Times-Dispatch and served in Mosby's Rangers during the Civil War.	
Farmville Confederate statue		Farmville	Virginia	June 15, 2020	June 18, 2020	Removal ordered by town council	A pedestal supporting the soldier statue was not removed. The statue was placed in offsite storage pending final disposition or relocation.	
Bust of Hunter Holmes McGuire		Richmond	Virginia	July 16, 2020			Committee at Virginia Commonwealth University recommended removing bust from library along with removing several plagues and renaming several buildings around campus	
Virginia Beach Confederate monument		Virginia Beach	Virginia	July 23, 2020	July 25, 2020	Removed by city council	Placed in storage, city will solicit proposals from museums for relocations	
Statue of Robert E. Lee (pictured) Busts of Fitzhugh Lee, J. E. B. Stuart, Stonewall Jackson, Joseph E. Johnston, Jefferson Davis and Alexander Stephens Plaque for Thomas Bocock		Richmond	Virginia	July 24, 2020	July 24, 2020	Removed by order of House Speaker Eileen Filler-Corn	One statue, six busts, and one plaque commemorating Confederate leaders were removed from the Virginia State Capitol's Old House Chamber, where rebel leaders met when Richmond was the capitol of the Confederacy. Filler-Corn announced the creation of an advisory group to propose new memorials for the House.	
Company H monument		Newport News	Virginia	August 12, 2020		City Council voted 6–1 to remove	The monument for the Confederate veterans of Company H, 32nd Virginia Infantry has been covered since June 11	
Caroline County Confederate Monument		Bowling Green	Virginia	August 25			The Caroline County Board of Supervisors voted unanimously to remove the monument.	
At Ready 1909		Charlottesville	Virginia		Sep 12, 2020	Removed by county		
Robert E. Lee Monument Henry Shrady and Leo Lentelli, 1924		Charlottesville	Virginia	Jul 9, 2021	Jul 10, 2021	Removed by city	A previous attempt to remove the statue prompted the Unite the Right rally in 2017. The statue was removed to storage in July 2021. The statue was melted down on October 27, 2023.	
Equestrian statue of Stonewall Jackson Charles Keck, 1919–1921		Charlottesville	Virginia	Jul 9, 2021	Jul 10, 2021	Removed by city	One of four public sculptures in the city removed over the weekend of July 10–11 (the others being the monuments to Lee, Lewis and Clark, and George Rogers Clark).	

==== Genocide of indigenous peoples ====
Monuments dedicated to individuals accused of involvement in the genocide of indigenous peoples in the Americas have been removed.

Juan de Oñate, when governor of Santa Fe de Nuevo México, was responsible for the 1599 Acoma Massacre. Junípero Serra, a Franciscan friar, was involved in enslaving Chumash people in the 18th century for the building and supplying of the Spanish missions in California. Diego de Vargas, also governor of Santa Fe de Nuevo México, led the reconquest of the territory in 1692, after the Pueblo Revolt of 1680.

A handful of towns in Spain have offered to receive statues of Spaniards unwanted in the U.S.

Monument/memorial		City	State	Removal announced	Removed	Means of removal	Notes	Ref.
Equestrian statue of Juan de Oñate	Equestrian statue of Juan de Oñate	Alcalde	New Mexico	Jun 15, 2020	Jun 15, 2020	Temporarily removed by Río Arriba County authorities	The right foot of the statue was cut off and stolen in 1997, in reference to Oñate's Acoma Massacre, in which the right foot of every male over 25 was cut off.	
Statue of Juan de Oñate		Albuquerque	New Mexico	—	Jun 16, 2020	Removed by city pending a decision on next steps	Statue in front of the Albuquerque Museum removed after an armed counter-protester shot a protester.	
Statue of Diego de Vargas	Statue of Diego de Vargas	Santa Fe	New Mexico	Jun 17, 2020	Jun 18, 2020	Removal ordered by the mayor	Vargas is remembered for reconquering Santa Fe de Nuevo México after the Pueblo Revolt. The statue was removed from Cathedral Park under the direction of Mayor Alan Webber.	
Kit Carson Obelisk	Santa Fe Federal Courthouse, with the Kit Carson obelisk to the left	Santa Fe	New Mexico	Jun 18, 2020		Removal ordered by the mayor	In front of federal courthouse	
Civil War Monument		Denver	Colorado	Jun 25, 2020	Jun 25, 2020	Toppled by protesters	The monument honors Colorado citizens who served in the Union Army. It listed battles against Native Americans in addition to battles against the Confederacy. Most controversially, it listed the Sand Creek massacre (a mass killing of Cheyenne and Arapaho Native Americans) as a battle.	
American Indian War Memorial, or Soldiers Monument 1867/1868		Santa Fe	New Mexico	Jun 25, 2020	Oct 12, 2020	Removal ordered by the mayor; toppled by protesters	The obelisk in the Santa Fe Plaza commemorated battles against Native Americans (formerly referred to as "savage Indians" in the inscription) as well as Union soldiers in the Civil War. Destroyed during Indigenous Peoples' Day protests.	
Statues of Junípero Serra After John Palo-Kangas, 1987 and 1988		Ventura	California	Jul 15, 2020	Jul 26, 2020	Removal voted 6–0 by Ventura City Council (includes wooden replica by local carvers). Previously agreed to by the Mayor and representatives of the Barbareño/Ventureño Band of Mission Indians and Mission San Buenaventura.	1936 commission in front of Ventura County Courthouse by the Works Progress Administration as part of the Federal Art Project	
Statue of Junípero Serra	Statue of Junípero Serra	San Francisco	California	Jun 19, 2020	Jun 19, 2020	Toppled by protesters	Was installed in Golden Gate Park	
Statue of Junípero Serra		Los Angeles	California	Jun 20, 2020	Jun 20, 2020	Toppled by protesters	Was displayed on Olvera Street, the center of Los Angeles when it was Mexican.	
Statue of Junípero Serra		San Luis Obispo	California	Jun 22, 2020	Jun 22, 2020	Removed by local mission personnel	Was displayed on grounds of the San Luis Obispo Mission	
Statue of Junípero Serra		Carmel	California		Jun 23, 2020	Removed by city as a safeguarding measure	There are several statues of Serra in Carmel. This is the one by Jo Mora, at intersection of Serra Avenue with Camino Del Monte.	
Statue of Kit Carson, Pioneer Fountain		Denver	Colorado	Jun 26, 2020	Jun 26, 2020	Removed by city	The Carson statue was the third statue removed in Denver within two days; it was removed so as to prevent it from being toppled by protesters.	
Statue of Junípero Serra		San Gabriel	California	Not announced	c. Jun 26, 2020	Moved from the front of the mission to its garden, described as "away from public view"		
Statue of Junípero Serra	Statue of Junípero Serra	Sacramento	California		Jul 4, 2020	Toppled by protesters; put into storage	Part of California State Capitol Museum's exhibit in Capitol Park near the California State Capitol	
Statue of John Mason		Windsor	Connecticut	Jul 6, 2020		City must get approval from state, which owns the statue, in order to move it to the Windsor Historical Society	Mason is remembered for his role in the Pequot Massacre.	
Statue of Alexander Andreyevich Baranov		Sitka	Alaska	Jul 14, 2020		Sitka Assembly voted 6–1 to move the statue from the front of Harrigan Centennial Hall into the Sitka Historical Museum	Baranov was a Chief Manager of the Russian-American Company involved in the Russian colonization of Alaska, including founding Sitka (as New Archangel) and Kodiak (as Pavlovskaya Gavan). He is said to have been involved in the genocide of the native Tlingit and Aleut people.	
Theodore Roosevelt, Rough Rider Alexander Phimister Proctor, 1922		Portland	Oregon	—	Oct 11, 2020	Toppled by protesters. Later restored and currently set to be reinstalled later this year.	Toppled in a protest (referred to as the "Indigenous Peoples Day of Rage") against Columbus Day. Roosevelt is recorded as having had a hostile attitude toward Native Americans. Monument has been restored and is set to be reinstalled later this year.	
Statue of Abraham Lincoln George Fite Waters, 1926		Portland	Oregon	—	Oct 11, 2020	Toppled by protesters. Later restored and currently set to be reinstalled later this year.	This statue was toppled shortly after that of Roosevelt nearby. "Dakota 38" was spray-painted on the pedestal, a reference to Lincoln's approving the execution of 38 Dakota men after the Dakota War of 1862. Monument has been restored and is set to be reinstalled later this year.	

===== Christopher Columbus =====
Several statues of Christopher Columbus, the initiator of the European colonization of the Americas, have been removed because of his alleged enslavement of and systemic violence against the indigenous peoples of the Caribbean, including the genocide of the Taíno people.

In 2025, The New York Times found that several Columbus statues removed from American cities during the protests had been subsequently restored for display in less prominent locations by Italian American groups such as the Sons of Italy. Most such statues had originally been gifted by Italian Americans rather than being commissioned by the government. In October 2025, it was announced that a replica of the toppled and vandalized Baltimore statue would be placed on display at the White House. The replica was placed on the north side of the Eisenhower Executive Office Building in March 2026.

Monument/memorial		City	State	Removal announced	Removed	Means of removal	Notes	Ref.
Statue Ferruccio Legnaioli, 1926	Christopher Columbus statue	Richmond	Virginia	Jun 9, 2020	Jun 9, 2020	Toppled by protesters	The statue was toppled, lit on fire, and dumped in a nearby lake by protesters who stated that they were acting in solidarity with Native Americans. Later recovered and restored for display at the Sons of Italy hall in Blauvelt, New York.	
Statue Carlo Brioschi, 1931	Christopher Columbus statue	St. Paul	Minnesota	Jun 10, 2020	Jun 10, 2020	Toppled by protesters	The statue, located next to the Minnesota State Capitol, was toppled by members of the American Indian Movement.	
Statue Andrew J. Mazzola, 1979	Statue of Christopher Columbus	Boston	Massachusetts	—	Jun 11, 2020	Decapitated by protesters, removed by city	The statue was removed following vandalism and a review. Repaired, donated to the Knights of Columbus, and placed on display at a Catholic church.	
Statue 1915		Camden	New Jersey	Jun 11, 2020	Jun 11, 2020	Removed by city	Removal ordered by mayor Frank Moran after many years of vandalism.	
Statue Joe Incrapera, 1992		Houston	Texas	Jun 11, 2020	Jun 19, 2020	Removed by city	The statue was removed from Bell Park a week after being vandalized with red paint and having a hand cut off.	
Statue Armand Battelli, 1928		New London	Connecticut	Jun 11, 2020	—	Mayor ordered removal	The statue will be removed pending a review	
Statue Egidio Giaroli, 1957		Wilmington	Delaware	Jun 12, 2020	Jun 12, 2020	Removed by city	Removal ordered by mayor Mike Purzycki to be stored while the display of the statue is discussed.	
Statue Estelle Hampton Frierson and Stavros Alexander Chrysostomides, 1992		Columbia	South Carolina	Jun 12, 2020	Jun 12, 2020	Removed by city	Removal and storage ordered by mayor Steve Benjamin and City Council.	
Statue Mario Zamora, 1989		Chula Vista	California	—	Jun 12, 2020	Removed by city	The city put the statue in storage ahead of a protest on June 12, 2020. On May 5, 2021, the Chula Vista City Council voted to permanently remove the statue. In November 2022, Discovery Park was renamed Kumeyaay Park of Chula Vista (see below).	
Statue Jerry T. Williams, 1996		Middletown	Connecticut	—	Jun 13, 2020	City of Middletown removed statue	Statue was already slated to be stored due to maintenance work at the park	
Monument 1992		West Orange	New Jersey	Jun 13, 2020	—	Removal ordered by West Orange Mayor Robert Parisi	No final removal date has yet been announced.	
Bust Augusto Rivalta, 1910		Detroit	Michigan	Jun 15, 2020	Jun 15, 2020	Removed by city	Removal and storage ordered by mayor Mike Duggan.	
Statue Vincenzo Miserendino, 1926		Hartford	Connecticut	Jun 15, 2020	Jun 29, 2020		Mayor Luke Bronin announced that the statue near the Connecticut State Capitol would be removed.	
Statue 1952 (recast of an 1892 original)		New Haven	Connecticut	Jun 15, 2020	Jun 24, 2020	Removed by city		
Statue Alfred Solani, c. 1950s		Columbus	Ohio	Jun 16, 2020	Jun 19, 2020	Removal ordered by college	Removal announced by Columbus State Community College's president of the board of trustees, to be stored while the future of the statue is discussed.	
Statue Ferdinand von Miller II, 1884	Christopher Columbus Statue in St. Louis	St. Louis	Missouri	Jun 16, 2020	Jun 16, 2020	Removed by city	Removal ordered by St. Louis Park Board	
Columbus' Last Appeal to Queen Isabella Larkin Goldsmith Mead, 1868–1874		Sacramento	California	Jun 16, 2020	Jul 7, 2020	Removal ordered by California State Legislature	The sculptural group, installed in the California State Capitol in 1883, shows Columbus persuading Isabella I of Castile to fund his 1492 voyage.	
Statue Vittorio di Colbertaldo, 1957		San Francisco	California	Jun 18, 2020	Jun 18, 2020	Removed by the San Francisco Arts Commission	The statue, located next to Coit Tower, was removed by the City ahead of a planned Juneteenth protest to throw it into the San Francisco Bay.	
Statue Edoardo Alfieri, 1955		Columbus	Ohio	Jun 18, 2020	Jul 1, 2020	Removal ordered by city	Removal announced by the City of Columbus.	
Statue Emanuele Caroni, c. 1875		Philadelphia	Pennsylvania	Jun 24, 2020	—	Statue retained and shroud removed after successful court challenge.	On August 12, 2020, the Philadelphia Art Commission issued an order to remove the statue from Marconi Plaza and to place it in temporary storage. This followed an endorsement of a city proposal, two weeks prior, by the Philadelphia Historical Commission, to remove the statue, citing public safety and susceptibility of damage to the statue as a result of the George Floyd protests. A judge later halted the order, while a legal battle continues in the courts. Citing preservation of the statue pending a final decision, the City of Philadelphia had it boxed. On August 17, 2021, a judge from Philadelphia Common Pleas Court ruled the decision for removing the statue to be without legal merit. On December 9, 2022, a ruling by the Pennsylvania Commonwealth Court ordered the plywood box enclosure to be removed.	
Statue c. 1940		Norwalk	Connecticut	Jun 25, 2020	Jun 25, 2020	Removed by city		
Statue Frédéric Auguste Bartholdi, 1893		Providence	Rhode Island	Jun 25, 2020	Jun 25, 2020	Removed by city	Purchased by Joseph Paolino, a former mayor of Providence, and reinstalled in the nearby town of Johnston in 2023.	
Statue Giuseppe Ciochetti, 1927	Statue of Christopher Columbus	Newark	New Jersey	Jun 25, 2020	Jun 25, 2020	Removed by city	The statue was removed from Washington Park due to the risk of people injuring themselves trying to topple it. The statue will be kept in storage until a final determination is reached regarding the statue's fate.	
Statue William F. Joseph, 1970	Memorial to Christopher Columbus	Denver	Colorado	Jun 26, 2020	Jun 26, 2020	Removed by protesters	The statue was originally placed in front of the Denver Civic Center in the 1970s.	
Statue Gaetano Chiaromonte, 1958		Atlantic City	New Jersey	Jun 28, 2020			Being removed "to avert potential vandalism"	
Statue Armando Dattelli, 1957		San Antonio	Texas	Jun 30, 2020	Jul 1, 2020	Removed by city		
Statue Frank Gaylord, 1984		Waterbury	Connecticut		Jul 4, 2020 (reported)	Decapitated; later repaired	Located outside Waterbury City Hall	
Statue Mauro Bigarani, 1984		Baltimore	Maryland		Jul 4, 2020	Toppled by protesters	After the statue was toppled from its base, it was dumped into Baltimore's Inner Harbor. Later recovered and used to make a mold for two replicas; one was installed at the White House in March 2026.	
Statue Clemente Spampinato, 1964		Bridgeport	Connecticut	Not announced	Jul 6, 2020	Removed by city	Placed in storage following removal.	
Statue 1992		Columbus	Wisconsin	Jul 6, 2020		City Council voted to put it in storage until another home is found		
Statue 1959		Trenton	New Jersey	Jul 7, 2020	Jul 8, 2020	Removed by city		
Relief on the Italian Heritage Monument		Norwich	Connecticut	Jun 24, 2020	Planned for September	Removal ordered by Norwich Italian Heritage & Cultural Community	The portrayal of Columbus was ordered to be removed in order to protect the monument from vandalism. The relief will be replaced with a statement honoring Italian immigrants to Norwich.	
Statue Giovanni Polizzi, 1952		Buffalo	New York	Jul 10, 2020	Jul 10, 2020	Removed by city	Columbus Park, where the statue was located, was renamed to Prospect Park as well.	
Statue Carlo Brioschi, 1933 Statue Moses Jacob Ezekiel, 1891		Chicago	Illinois	Jul 24, 2020	Jul 24, 2020	Removed by city	Statues in Grant Park and Little Italy's Arrigo Park ordered removed by Mayor Lori Lightfoot amid continued protests and the deployment of federal forces to Chicago over Lightfoot's objections.	
Statue Richard Henry Park, 1893		Chicago	Illinois	Jul 31, 2020	Jul 30, 2020	Removed by city	A 7-foot tall statue of Columbus, part of the Drake Fountain, was removed on the orders of Mayor Lori Lightfoot. It was the last known monument to Columbus in the city.	
Statue Laura Bradley Park, 1947		Peoria	Illinois	Sep 24, 2020	Oct 9, 2020	Removed by city		
Statue Frank Vittor, 1958		Pittsburgh	Pennsylvania	Oct 28, 2020		Removal approved by Pittsburgh Mayor Bill Peduto and Pittsburgh Art Commission. Shrouded.	Pending outcome of lawsuit	
Park		Chula Vista	California	Nov 1, 2022		Renamed by city	Nearly three years after the Statue of Christopher Columbus was removed from the park (see above) the Chula Vista City Council voted unanimously to rename the park that references Columbus's apocryphal discovery of America to Kumeyaay Park of Chula Vista to honor the aboriginal title holders of the land it is in.	

==== Others ====
Monument/memorial		City	State	Removal announced	Removed	Means of removal	Notes	Ref.
Statue of Edward W. Carmack	Statue of Edward W. Carmack	Nashville	Tennessee	—	May 30, 2020	Toppled by protesters	Senator Carmack was an opponent of Ida B. Wells and encouraged retaliation for her support of the civil rights movement.	
Statue of Frank Rizzo		Philadelphia	Pennsylvania		Jun 3, 2020	Removed by city. Mural of Rizzo painted over (see below, under Other artworks).	At about 2 am, the statue of Philadelphia police chief and mayor Frank Rizzo was removed.	
One Riot, One Ranger	One Riot, One Ranger	Dallas	Texas	Jun 4, 2020	Jun 4, 2020	Removed by city	Statue model helped prevent black students from enrolling in public schools.	
Statue of Orville L. Hubbard	Statue of Orville Hubbard	Dearborn	Michigan	—	Jun 5, 2020		Hubbard, the mayor of Dearborn for 35 years, was an outspoken segregationist.	
Statue of Jerry Richardson		Charlotte	North Carolina	Jun 10, 2020	Jun 10, 2020	Removed by Carolina Panthers	Richardson was alleged to be racist and sexist. The statue was removed from the Bank of America Stadium for fear it would be destroyed by protesters.	
Bust of Avery Brundage		San Francisco	California			Removed by museum	Brundage was a founding patron of the Asian Art Museum, Alleged white supremacist and anti-semite as well as 5th IOC president who expelled Tommie Smith and John Carlos from the 1968 Summer Olympics for raising black-gloved fists while on the podium. Bust moved from prominent position in foyer of museum to storage.	
Richmond Police Memorial		Richmond	Virginia	Jun 11, 2020	Jun 11, 2020	Removed by city after being vandalized by protesters	Dedicated to Richmond police officers who lost their lives in the line of duty. Removed from Byrd Park after repeated vandalization. The mayor's office stated the statue would be restored and reinstalled.	
Statue of Philip Schuyler	Statue of Philip Schuyler	Albany	New York	Jun 11, 2020	—	Plans for removal by city	Removal ordered by mayor Kathy Sheehan due to the fact that Schuyler owned slaves.	
Delaware Law Enforcement Memorial		Dover	Delaware	—	Jun 12, 2020	Vandalized by protesters, removed by city for restoration	Statue partially decapitated. The adjacent memorial wall was unaffected.	
Equestrian statue of Caesar Rodney		Wilmington	Delaware	Jun 12, 2020	Jun 12, 2020	Removed by city	Rodney was a slave owner. Removal ordered by mayor Mike Purzycki to be stored while the display of the statue is discussed.	
Bust of John McDonogh	Bust of John McDonogh in June 2017	New Orleans	Louisiana	—	Jun 13, 2020	Removed by protesters	Protesters removed the bust from Duncan Plaza and rolled it into the Mississippi River.	
The Pioneer	The Pioneer at its installation in 1919	Eugene	Oregon	—	Jun 13, 2020	Toppled and dragged by protesters	The University of Oregon placed its two Pioneer statues in storage on June 14	
The Pioneer Mother		Eugene	Oregon	—	Jun 13, 2020	Toppled by protesters	The University of Oregon placed its two Pioneer statues in storage on June 14	
Statue of Thomas Jefferson at Jefferson High School	Thomas Jefferson statue at Jefferson High School	Portland	Oregon	—	Jun 14, 2020	Toppled after Black Lives Matter protest, allegedly by people unassociated with protest	1916 bronze replica of 1911 statue by Karl Bitter	
Statue of Josephus Daniels		Raleigh	North Carolina	Jun 16, 2020	Jun 16, 2020	Removed by Daniels's descendants	The statue was located near The News & Observer building, which is scheduled to be demolished. Daniels's family claims to have acted on their own accord rather than on pressure from activists, and will keep the statue in storage until a decision is made on its ultimate fate.	
Statue of John Sutter	Statue of John Sutter	Sacramento	California	Jun 16, 2020	Jun 16, 2020	Removed by Sutter Health	The statue was located in front of Sutter General Hospital. Sutter was a California Gold Rush pioneer who enslaved Native Americans.	
Monument to William Clark	See image	Portland	Oregon		June 17–18, 2020	Removed by the University of Portland	The university removed the monument "as a precaution".	
Statue of George Washington	Statue of George Washington	Portland	Oregon	—	Jun 18, 2020	Toppled by protesters. Currently undergoing restoration. Will return to public display in another yet to be determined location.		
Statue of Francis Scott Key	Statue of Francis Scott Key	San Francisco	California	—	Jun 18, 2020	Toppled by protesters	Part of a group of statues toppled in Golden Gate Park.	
Bust of Ulysses S. Grant	Bust of Ulysses S. Grant	San Francisco	California	—	Jun 18, 2020	Toppled by protesters	Part of a group of statues toppled in Golden Gate Park.	
Statue of Calvin Griffith		Minneapolis	Minnesota	—		Removed by Minnesota Twins	Griffith was the former owner of the Minnesota Twins; the statue was removed due to racist statements made by Griffith in 1978 suggesting he moved the team to Minnesota due to the low number of African-American residents.	
Monument to George Preston Marshall		Washington	District of Columbia	—	Jun 19, 2020	Removed by Events DC	Removed from Robert F. Kennedy Memorial Stadium. Washington Redskins' front office was not consulted.	
Statue of Thomas Jefferson		Decatur	Georgia	Jun 19, 2020	Jun 19, 2020	Removed by city	The statue was previously located in front of the old city courthouse. A city official claimed the statue was removed to protect it from damage.	
Equestrian Statue of Theodore Roosevelt	Theodore Roosevelt on horseback accompanied by two men on foot	New York City	New York	Jun 20, 2020	Jan 19, 2022	Removed by the American Museum of Natural History in New York City, moving from city-owned land to the Theodore Roosevelt Presidential Library Foundation	Theodore Roosevelt on horseback accompanied by walking figures of two men, one a Native American and one African; in front of the American Museum of Natural History.	
Forward	Forward sculpture	Madison	Wisconsin	—	Jun 23, 2020	Removed by protesters. Later restored.	"Forward" is the motto of the state of Wisconsin. A 1998 bronze replica of a commissioned 1893 work of the Wisconsin female artist Jean Pond Miner. Repaired and restored to its original site on 21 September 2021.	
John C. Calhoun Monument		Charleston	South Carolina	Jun 22, 2020	Jun 23, 2020	Removed by city	Calhoun was a leading advocate of slavery. The statue may be placed back on display at "an appropriate site" such as a museum.	
Statue of Thomas Jefferson		Hempstead	New York		Jun 23, 2020	Moved by university	Statue at Hofstra University moved from student center main entrance to university museum.	
Statue of Hans Christian Heg	Statue of Hans Christian Heg	Madison	Wisconsin	—	Jun 23, 2020	Removed by protesters. Later restored.	Heg was a Union Army colonel in the Civil War, and an abolitionist. His statue was decapitated and thrown into a lake by protesters. Two protesters interviewed by the media alleged that toppling the statue was to draw attention to their view of Wisconsin as being racially unjust. The statue was repaired and restored to its original location on September 21, 2021.	
Emancipation Memorial (replica)		Boston	Massachusetts	Jun 30, 2020	Dec 29, 2020			
Thompson Elk Fountain		Portland	Oregon		Jul 1, 2020	Statue removed by city after fires set by protesters seriously damaged its base. Base has been mostly dismantled. Base restored and statue re-installed in April 2026.	Restored and returned to public display.	
Statue of George Whitefield		Philadelphia	Pennsylvania	Jul 2, 2020			Whitefield was a supporter of slavery.	
Statue of Frederick Douglass		Rochester	New York	—	Jul 5, 2020	Torn down by unknown perpetrators. Later restored.	Maplewood Park is a site along the Underground Railroad where Douglass and Harriet Tubman helped shuttle slaves to freedom. Removal occurred on the anniversary of Douglass's famous 1852 "What to the Slave Is the Fourth of July?" speech in Rochester.	
Statue of Andrew Jackson		Jackson	Mississippi	Jul 7, 2020		City Council voted to remove statue in front of City Hall.		
Statue of Thomas Ruffin		Raleigh	North Carolina	Not announced	Jul 13, 2020	Was in front of North Carolina Court of Appeals. Removed by Court.	Ruffin, a Chief Justice, was a slaveowner and author of pro-slavery rulings.	
Statue of Hiawatha		La Crosse	Wisconsin	Jul 13, 2020		Mayor has asked for its removal following request of sculptor's family.		
Statue of Jesus Christ		Miami	Florida		Jul 15, 2020 (discovered)	Decapitated and knocked off a pedestal.	At Good Shepherd Catholic Church.	
Statue of the Virgin Mary		Chattanooga	Tennessee		Jul 15, 2020 (discovered)	Statue was torn down and decapitated; head stolen.	The motive for the destruction is unknown. Local police stated that the toppling is a possible hate crime.	
Monument to the 77th New York Volunteer Infantry (Union Army unit)		Saratoga Springs	New York		Jul 16, 2020 (discovered)	Statue was torn off pedestal and destroyed.	The motive and perpetrator behind the destruction are both unknown. The statue was located in a park where many other monuments have historically been vandalized.	
Bust of Roger B. Taney		Washington	District of Columbia	Jul 22, 2020		Voted by the House of Representatives	The bust of Chief Justice Taney, outside the Old Supreme Court Chamber, will be replaced with a bust of Thurgood Marshall, the first Black Supreme Court Justice. Taney wrote the majority opinion in Dred Scott v. Sandford, stating that African Americans were not citizens and had no rights.	
Statue of Francis Drake Dennis Patton, 1990		Larkspur	California	Jul 29, 2020	Jul 29, 2020	Removed by city	The statue was removed by the city authorities, some of whom cited safety concerns. The statue became a target for vandalism because of Sir Francis Drake's association with colonialism, the transatlantic slave trade, and piracy.	
Statue of Louis XVI Achille Valois, 1829		Louisville	Kentucky		Sep 3, 2020	Removed by city	Citing protest-related vandalism damage and possible protester injuries during further vandalism attempts, officials decided to store the statue indefinitely. Mayor Greg Fischer said that it may be repaired and placed back on display.	
Statue of Harvey W. Scott Gutzon Borglum, 1933		Portland	Oregon	—	Oct 20, 2020	Toppled by protestors	The statue was located on Mount Tabor, and was replaced by the bust of York, which was created by Todd McGrain and installed without authorization by the City of Portland. The bust was also toppled and later removed.	
Statue of John O'Donnell Tylden Streett, 1980		Canton, Baltimore	Maryland		Apr 5, 2021	Removed to an undisclosed location	O'Donnell founded Canton in 1786 as a slave plantation.	
Memorial to Meriwether Lewis and William Clark Charles Keck, 1919		Charlottesville	Virginia	Jul 10, 2021	Jul 10, 2021	Removed by city	The sculpture shows Sacagawea in a submissive pose. The decision to remove the monument was made in an emergency meeting of Charlottesville City Council, when the contracting company which had removed two Confederate statues earlier that day offered to remove this monument at no extra cost.	
Monument to George Rogers Clark Robert Ingersoll Aitken, 1921		Charlottesville	Virginia		Jul 11, 2021	Removed by the University of Virginia	Removed to storage a day after the dismantling of three other monuments in Charlottesville. The university will work with a committee to decide on a new site.	
Statue of Walt Whitman		Camden	New Jersey	Jul 12, 2021			The statue of the poet, prominently located in the Campus Center courtyard at Rutgers University–Camden, will be removed to another site on campus.	
Statue of Pete Wilson 2007		San Diego	California		Oct 15, 2021	Temporarily removed by Horton Walk, the nonprofit that owns the statue	Activists for racial justice and gay rights held a press conference in front of the statue on Broadway Circle at Horton Plaza Park on October 12, 2020, "in the wake of nationwide demands for the removal of statues of confederate generals and people who owned slaves". The statue was removed on October 15 due to "safety concerns". The president of the nonprofit that owns the statue later issued a statement that the statue was reinstated on November 30 and that it was a "symbol of all that is great about San Diego". Wilson has been widely criticized for signing Proposition 187 and the Three Strikes Law.	
Statue of Thomas Jefferson Pierre-Jean David d'Angers, 1834		New York City	New York	Oct 19, 2021	Nov 22, 2021	Removed to the New-York Historical Society	On October 18, the city's Public Design Commission voted unanimously to remove the statue in the New York City Council chamber.	
Monument to Thomas Fallon Robert Glen, 1990		San Jose	California	Nov 10, 2021			San Jose City Council voted unanimously on November 9 to remove the monument.	

- Nazi POW Gravestones. San Antonio, Texas. Announced June 1. Removed December 23. Removed by Fort Sam Houston National Cemetery employees. Source.

=== United Kingdom ===
==== Atlantic slave trade ====
The Royal African Company, which engaged in African slave trading between 1662 and 1731, enslaved and shipped more Africans to the Americas than any other institution in the history of the Atlantic slave trade.

Monument/memorial		Location	Removal announced	Removed	Means of removal	Notes	Ref.
Statue of Edward Colston John Cassidy, 1895	Statue of Edward Colston	Bristol	—	Jun 7, 2020	Toppled by protesters	The statue of Edward Colston, a slave trader, was toppled and thrown into Bristol Harbour by protesters. The statue was fished out, but the city council did not reinstall it, waiting for a democratic decision from the people of Bristol on what to do with it. On July 15, it was briefly replaced by Marc Quinn's A Surge of Power (Jen Reid) 2020, a sculpture of a protester who had been photographed standing on the vacant plinth with her fist raised; the council removed this work the next day. In June 2021, the defaced statue was put on display at the city's M Shed museum.	
Statue of Robert Milligan Richard Westmacott, 1813	Statue of Robert Milligan	London	Jun 9, 2020	Jun 9, 2020	Removed by local authorities	Statue of Robert Milligan, a Scottish merchant and slave trader, outside the Museum of London Docklands. It was removed following a request from the Canal & River Trust.	
Statue of Sir John Cass		London	Jun 11, 2020	Jun 11, 2020	Removed by owner	Statue of Sir John Cass at the University of East London Stratford Campus.	
Statue of Sir Robert Clayton Grinling Gibbons, 1714	Statue of Sir Robert Clayton	London	Jun 11, 2020	—	Plans for removal by owner	Statue of Sir Robert Clayton at St Thomas' Hospital. On June 11 the Guy's and St Thomas' NHS Foundation Trust, the Guy's and St Thomas' Charity, and King's College London issued a joint statement announcing that the statues of Clayton and Thomas Guy would be removed from public view.	
Statue of Thomas Guy Peter Scheemakers, 1734	Statue of Thomas Guy	London	Jun 11, 2020	—	Plans for removal by owner	Statue of Thomas Guy at Guy's Hospital. On June 11 the Guy's and St Thomas' NHS Foundation Trust, the Guy's and St Thomas' Charity, and King's College London issued a joint statement announcing that the statues of Guy and Sir Robert Clayton would be removed from public view.	
Statue of Sir John Cass 1998 (After Louis-François Roubiliac, 1751)	Statue of Sir John Cass	London	Jun 12, 2020	Before July 19, 2020	Removed by owner	Statue of Sir John Cass on the façade of 31 Jewry Street in the City of London, the headquarters of Sir John Cass's Foundation. This statue is a fiberglass replica of the original.	
Statue and bust of Sir John Cass		London	Jun 16, 2020		Removed by owner	Statue and bust of Sir John Cass at Sir John Cass Redcoat School, Stepney. The school's governing body voted unanimously on June 16 for the immediate removal of the sculptures. The school has since changed its name to Stepney All Saints School.	
Bust of Sir John Cass	Bust of Sir John Cass	London	Jun 18, 2020	Jun 18, 2020	Removed by church	Bust of Sir John Cass in St Botolph's Church, Aldgate.	
Statue of Sir Thomas Picton T. Mewburn Crook, 1916		Cardiff	Jul 23, 2020	—	Plans for removal by owner	On July 23, Cardiff Council voted to remove the statue from the gallery of Welsh heroes inside City Hall, on account of Picton's links to the slave trade, and his authorizing of the torture of a 14-year-old girl while Governor of Trinidad. Immediately following the vote, the statue was encased in wooden boards to hide it from view until it could be removed.	
Bust of Sir Hans Sloane John Michael Rysbrack, 1730s		London	Not announced	Aug 25, 2020 (newspaper story)	Relocated by the British Museum	Sloane was a slave owner and partly funded his collection, which became the founding collection of the British Museum, from enslaved labour on Jamaican sugar plantations. His bust in the museum's Enlightenment gallery was moved to a display case in the same gallery stressing his connections to colonialism and slavery.	
Monument to John Gordon		Dorchester	Sep 24, 2020	May 19, 2023	Removed by parochial church council (PCC) and given to local museum	Wall monument in St. Peter's Church to John Gordon, who played a role in suppressing Tacky's Revolt, a slave rebellion in Jamaica in 1760. The PCC voted to remove the monument and offer it to a museum. After going through the church planning process, the monument was finally removed on May 19, 2023 and given to Dorset Museum. A replacement monument will bear the details of Gordon's life and death only, with no mention of the uprising.	

==== Others ====
Monument/memorial		Location	Removal announced	Removed	Means of removal	Notes	Ref.
Part of Green Man inn sign 18th century		Ashbourne, Derbyshire	c. Jun 7, 2020	Jun 8, 2020	Removed by local residents	Wooden sculpture of a caricatured "black's head". After a Facebook petition calling for its removal attracted close to 30,000 signatures, the district council announced that on June 9 it would be removing the sculpture. Before this could happen, it was removed by two local residents on the night of June 8.	
Dunham Massey sundial Attr. to Andries Carpentière, c. 1735	Dunham Massey sundial	Trafford, Greater Manchester	Jun 11, 2020	Jun 11, 2020	Removed by the National Trust	Statue of an exoticized black man (described as "degrading"), in a kneeling position and carrying a sundial, formerly installed in the forecourt of Dunham Massey Hall.	
Headstones of G. H. Elliott (pictured) and Alice Banford 1962		Rottingdean, East Sussex	Jun 16, 2020	Jun 15, 2020	Removed after authorization by the Chancellor of Chichester Diocese	The gravestones of the music hall singers, who performed in blackface and were described on the stones as "The Chocolate Coloured Coon" and "Coon Dancer" respectively, were removed from St Margaret's Churchyard to a secure place.	
Pet gravestone at Coombe Abbey Park 1902		Rugby, Warwickshire	—	Before Jul 2, 2020	Removed by Coventry City Council	In July 2019 a visitor to the park reported the name "Nigger" inscribed on the gravestone of a pet dog, but no action was taken at the time. After its absence was noticed following the George Floyd protests, the council (which operates the park) confirmed that it had removed the gravestone.	
Headstone for the dog Nigger 1943	Headstone for the dog	RAF Scampton, Lincolnshire	—	Jul 16, 2020	Removed by the Royal Air Force	The headstone for the grave of Guy Gibson's dog was replaced, removing any mention of the dog's name.	
A Surge of Power (Jen Reid) 2020 Marc Quinn and Jen Reid, 2020		Bristol	Jul 16, 2020	Jul 16, 2020	Removed by Bristol City Council because the sculpture had been placed without permission on the plinth of the statue of Edward Colston	Black resin sculpture by Marc Quinn and Jen Reid. It depicts Reid, a young black woman protester, raising her arm in a Black Power salute, reproducing a photo of her on the plinth, taken just after the removal of the previous statue by protesters.	

=== Belgium ===
King Leopold II of Belgium personally ruled the Congo Free State from 1885 to 1908, treating it as his personal property. During this period, many well-documented atrocities were perpetrated against the population, including the severing of hands of workers unable to meet a production quota for rubber, and the destruction of entire villages that were unwilling to participate in the forced labour regime. These acts contributed to a genocide during this period, often estimated at between five million and ten million.

Monument/memorial		Location	Removal announced	Removed	Means of removal	Notes	Ref.
Statue of Leopold II Joseph Jacques Ducaju, 1873	Statue of Leopold II	Ekeren, Antwerp	Jun 9, 2020	Jun 9, 2020	Removed by municipality	Removed after it had been vandalized and set on fire.	
Bust of Leopold II		Mons	Jun 10, 2020		Removed by university authorities	Removed from the Faculty of Economics and Management at the University of Mons following an online petition for its removal. Permanently placed in storage.	
Bust of Leopold II		Auderghem, Brussels	—	Jun 11, 2020	Toppled during the night	The bust was pulled down, red paint was splashed on it, and a photograph of Patrice Lumumba, the independent Congo's first prime minister, was placed on the pedestal.	
Bust of Leopold II		Leuven	—		Removed by university authorities	Removed from University Library at KU Leuven. Placed in storage. (Note: Rector Luc Sels's statement on the issue leaves open the possibility of the bust eventually coming out of storage.)	
Bust of Leopold II		Ghent	—	Jun 30, 2020	Removed by crane following a short ceremony	Removed from Zuidpark on the 60th anniversary of Congo's independence, and moved to a warehouse in STAM.	

=== New Zealand ===
Royal Navy officer John Fane Charles Hamilton, after whom the city of Hamilton is named, played a prominent part in the Tauranga campaign of the New Zealand Wars.

Monument/memorial		Location	Removal announced	Removed	Means of removal	Notes	Ref.
Statue of John Fane Charles Hamilton Margriet Windhausen, 2013	Statue of John Fane Charles Hamilton	Hamilton	Jun 12, 2020	Jun 12, 2020	Removed by city	City Council announced removal after request by Maori tribal confederation Waikato Tainui.	

=== South Africa ===
Statues that come down in South Africa were preceded by and done in the context of the Rhodes Must Fall movement that resulted in the removal of a statue of Cecil Rhodes at the University of Cape Town.

Monument/memorial	Location	Removal announced	Removed	Means of removal	Notes	Ref.
Statue of Martinus Theunis Steyn Anton van Wouw, 1929	Bloemfontein	Not announced	Jun 27, 2020		The statue, which "dominated" the main campus of the University of the Free State, was moved to the Anglo-Boer War Museum.	
Bust of Cecil Rhodes, at the Rhodes Memorial John Macallan Swan, 1912	Cape Town	Not announced	Jul 13, 2020 (discovered)	Removed after being decapitated by protesters.	The head was repaired and reattached in September 2020.	

=== India ===
Monument/memorial	Location	Removal announced	Removed	Means of removal	Notes	Ref.
Equestrian statue of Mark Cubbon Carlo Marochetti, 1866	Bangalore		Jun 28, 2020		A controversial statue of Sir Mark Cubbon, an English colonial administrator, was moved from front of the High Court of Karnataka building to Sri Chamarajendra Park. See Mark Cubbon#Death and legacy.	

=== France ===
On May 22, 2020, before the murder of George Floyd, two statues of Victor Schœlcher were torn down in Martinique, an overseas department of France. Further colonial monuments in the overseas departments were targeted later in the year and in 2021; those which were mutilated in the period after May 25, 2020, are listed here.

The French president Emmanuel Macron declared his opposition to removing statues relating to France's colonial history on June 14, 2020.

Monument/memorial		Location	Region	Removal announced	Removed	Means of removal	Notes	Ref.
Bust of Victor Schœlcher		Basse-Terre	Guadeloupe	—	Night of Jul 23–24, 2020	Decapitated	The bust was stolen overnight, and discovered more than 40 kilometers away the following morning.	
Statue of the Empress Joséphine Gabriel Vital Dubray, 1859	Statue of the Empress Joséphine	Fort-de-France	Martinique	—	Jul 26, 2020	Toppled by protesters	Joséphine, the first wife of Napoleon, was born on Martinique to a family that owned a sugar plantation. This statue was commissioned by her grandson Napoleon III, and had been missing its head since 1991.	
Statue of Pierre Belain d'Esnambuc 1935	Statue of Pierre Belain d'Esnambuc	Fort-de-France	Martinique	—	Jul 26, 2020	Destroyed by protesters	Belain founded the French colony at Martinique in 1635. In a video posted on social media, activists warned that the statues of Belain and Joséphine would be targeted unless they were officially removed by July 26.	
Statue of Voltaire Léon-Ernest Drivier	Statue of Voltaire	Paris	Île-de-France	Aug 17, 2020	c. Aug 17, 2020	Removed by city authorities	The philosophe invested in the French East India Company in the 1740s, when it was engaged in the Atlantic slave trade. His statue in the Square Honoré-Champion was said to have been removed temporarily for conservation; it will be re-erected at another location.	
Memorial to Victor Schœlcher 1998		Le Diamant	Martinique	—	Mar 5, 2021	Decapitated	The monument had been erected to mark the 150th anniversary of the abolition of slavery on Martinique; there are no plans to replace it.	

=== Barbados ===
Monument/memorial	Location	Removal announced	Removed	Means of removal	Notes	Ref.
Statue of Horatio Nelson, 1st Viscount Nelson Sir Richard Westmacott, 1813	Bridgetown	Jul 24, 2020	Nov 16, 2020	Removed by government	On July 24 John King, the Minister with responsibility for Culture, announced that the statue would be removed during the national Season of Emancipation, which came to an end on August 23. The removal was postponed in order to concentrate available funds on completing and opening a park in Saint Thomas, and eventually occurred on the International Day for Tolerance. The statue will be rehoused in the Barbados Museum.	

=== Canada ===
In Canada, removed statues were attacked in a general anticolonialist context, rather than being directly linked to the typical BLM targets in Britain or the United States.

Monument/memorial	Location	Province	Removal announced	Removed	Means of removal	Notes	Ref.
A Canadian Conversation Sir John A. Macdonald Ruth Abernethy, 2016	Baden	Ontario	Jul 27, 2020	c. Sep 3, 2020	Put into storage	Wilmot Township Council voted on July 27 for the statue's immediate removal.	
Monument to Sir John A. Macdonald George Edward Wade, 1895	Montreal	Quebec	—	Aug 30, 2020	Statue toppled and decapitated by protesters	The toppling occurred during a Defund the Police protest; the statue had been a target of vandalism in the past.	

=== Ireland ===
Monument/memorial	Location	Removal announced	Removed	Means of removal	Notes	Ref.
Égyptienne and Négresse statues Mathurin Moreau, 1867	Dublin	Jul 27, 2020	Jul 27, 2020	Removed by owners	The Shelbourne Hotel on St. Stephen's Green removed the four exterior statues "in light of recent world events". The statues have been said to represent "two Nubian Princesses and their shackled slave girls", a view which may derive from a 1951 book on the hotel by Elizabeth Bowen. After an examination by UCD art history professor Paula Murphy concluded that the statues were not representations of slaves and that the "shackles" were golden anklets indicating aristocratic status, it was announced that they would be restored to their plinths. They were reinstated on December 14.	

=== Colombia ===
Monument/memorial	Location	Department	Removal announced	Removed	Means of removal	Notes	Ref.
Equestrian statue of Sebastián de Belalcázar Victorio Macho, 1937	Popayán	Cauca		Sep 16, 2020	Toppled by protesters	Toppled and decapitated by members of the Misak indigenous community. Belalcázar was a Spanish conquistador credited with the foundation of important cities in modern-day Colombia and Ecuador. The monument was located on top of Morro del Tulcán, an indigenous archaeological site.	

=== Removals under consideration ===
Some officials have announced their decisions to remove monuments under their jurisdiction, and are currently working to push through whatever legislative or permission barriers they need to accomplish their goals.

- Alaska: Anchorage Mayor Ethan Berkowitz announced on June 24, 2020, that he will leave the decision about removal of the statue of James Cook in downtown Anchorage up to the Native Village of Eklutna and other area Denaʼina tribes.
- Florida: Protesters at Florida State University, Tallahassee, call for removal of the Eppes Statue, at the original entrance to the campus; he was a slaveowner who was influential in the founding of Florida State. The building of the College of Criminology and Criminal Justice is also named for him. Protesters are also calling for renaming of Doak Campbell Stadium.
- Louisiana: East Feliciana Parish Police Jury announced June 15, 2020, that they will revisit in two weeks the issue of a possible removal of a Confederate statue that sits outside their courthouse.
- Louisiana: City of Alexandria voted to have Confederate Monument in front of Rapides Parish Courthouse. However, there is an ongoing court case to determine who owns the statue: the City of Alexandria, Rapides Parish, or the UDC.
- Kentucky: Murray City Council passed a unanimous vote to remove the Confederate Monument of Robert E. Lee from in front of their courthouse. The County Attorney isn't sure if the county has authority to move the statue, which is on the National Register of Historic Places, and so is conducting further research. Public feedback is expected.
- Mississippi: Forrest County Supervisors passed a measure on June 15, 2020. In November, voters will decide about the removal of a Confederate monument in front of their courthouse.
- Ohio: As of June 14, 2020, Cincinnati city council member is making a motion to remove an equestrian statue of President William Henry Harrison from Piatt Park.
- Texas: Weatherford: The United Daughters of the Confederacy asked for the removal of the United Confederate Veterans of Parker County monument in front of the Parker County Courthouse.
- Virginia: Virginia Beach City Council announced on June 12, 2020, that they covered and fenced the Confederate monument sitting at the Old Princess Anne County Courthouse until after July 1, 2020, when the city will have the authority to make decisions about the monument. A public hearing will be scheduled in July 2020.
- Washington, D.C.: In July the House voted to remove 11 Confederate statues and statues of three others – Charles Aycock, John C. Calhoun, and James Paul Clarke – from the United States Capitol. The statues are part of the National Statuary Hall Collection, a set of 100, with two supplied by each state. Senate Republican leader Mitch McConnell said replacement decisions should be up to the individual states and the bill would need to pass the GOP-controlled Senate.

== Other artworks ==
=== United States ===
Artwork		City	State	Removal announced	Removed	Means of removal	Notes	Ref.
Ceiling mural in the lobby of McGill–Toolen Catholic High School		Mobile	Alabama	Jun 3, 2020	Jun 3, 2020	Removed by school	A mural in McGill–Toolen Catholic High School reproduces the former seal of Mobile, which included the Confederate flag. The Archdiocese of Mobile painted over the Confederate flag section so that it now resembles the Alabama state flag.	
Fresco in Memorial Hall		Lexington	Kentucky	Jun 5, 2020	—	Plans for removal by school	The fresco in the foyer of University of Kentucky's Memorial Hall has been criticized for its romanticized depiction of African-American slaves. The University President announced that it would be removed. However, there has been considerable opposition.	
Frank Rizzo Mural		Philadelphia	Pennsylvania	Jun 7, 2020	Jun 7, 2020	Painted over by city	Mural painted over in the early morning.	
America Receiving the Gifts of Nations	America Receiving the Gifts of Nations	Camden	New Jersey	Jun 18, 2020	Reported covered on June 23	Covered by university	The mosaic on the façade of the main entrance to the former Cooper Branch Library, now a building of Rutgers University–Camden, depicts Columbus, and indigenous people in subservient positions. Obscured while the university explores long-term options.	
Stained glass window in the Cathedral of the Rockies		Boise	Idaho	Jun 18, 2020	—	Removal ordered by church	The stained glass window depicts Robert E. Lee standing next to George Washington and Abraham Lincoln. It will be donated to the Idaho Black History Museum if it is removed intact.	
Four Confederate portraits in the United States Capitol	Portrait of Charles Frederick Crisp	Washington	District of Columbia	Jun 18, 2020	Jun 19, 2020	Removal ordered by House Speaker Nancy Pelosi	Removal of portraits of four House Speakers who served in the Confederacy – Robert M. T. Hunter, Howell Cobb, James Lawrence Orr, and Charles Frederick Crisp (pictured) – on Juneteenth.	
Baker Memorial Library weather vane Stanley Orcutt, 1928 (design)		Hanover	New Hampshire	Jun 15, 2020	Jun 25, 2020	Removed by university	The weather vane depicts a Native American sitting on the ground in front of Dartmouth College's founder, Eleazar Wheelock. The university's president, Philip J. Hanlon, stated that the portrayal of the Native American did not reflect Dartmouth's values.	

=== United Kingdom ===
Artwork		Location	Removal announced	Removed	Means of removal	Notes	Ref.
Stained glass windows in Bristol Cathedral and St Mary Redcliffe	Bristol Cathedral. The stained glass window in question is the large one on the left of the picture	Bristol	Jun 15, 2020	Jun 16, 2020	Removed by the Diocese of Bristol	Window panes commemorating Edward Colston at the parish church were removed, and similar panes at the cathedral have been covered up until they can be safely removed.	
Sir Ronald Fisher window at Gonville and Caius College Maria Ulatowska McClafferty, 1989	Stained glass window	Cambridge	Jul 29, 2020	—	Removed to storage by the college	The window commemorates Sir Ronald Fisher, a statistician and eugenicist. It is one of a series of windows marking scientific discoveries made by former members of the college, and depicts a Latin square, studied by Fisher. The college council decided on June 24 to remove the window, subject to listed building consent.	
Portraits of governors and directors of the Bank of England		London	Aug 27, 2021	—	Removed from display by the Bank	On June 18, 2020, the Bank announced a review of its collection of portraits of former governors and directors. This resulted in the removal from display of eight oil paintings and two busts of figures linked to the slave trade, including Gilbert Heathcote, James Bateman, Robert Bristow, Robert Clayton (pictured), William Dawsonne, William Manning and John Pearse.	

=== France ===
In metropolitan France, one of the few artworks connected to racism removed in this period is a mural paying tribute to George Floyd and Adama Traoré. The death of Adama Traoré in 2016 caused the Justice pour Adama movement against racism and police violence, which was reactivated in 2020, inspired by the Black Lives Matter movement in the United States.

Artwork	City	Département	Removal announced	Removed	Means of removal	Notes	Ref.
Mural in tribute to George Floyd and Adama Traoré	Stains	Seine-Saint-Denis	Jun 22, 2020	—	The Seine-Saint-Denis prefect authorised the preservation of the mural itself, but ordered the Communist mayor of Stains to erase the phrase Contre le racisme et les violences policières ("Against racism and police violence") contained in it, or at least the reference to "police violence", because the police union "Alliance" felt offended, in a context where police violence cases have been multiplying in France since 2018. Since the mayor did not obey, the prefect repeated the order on July 3. On the night of July 4–5, the painting was vandalized.	The mural depicts the faces of Adama Traoré and George Floyd in shades of grey and standing out from a sunny blue sky, with the phrase Contre le racisme et les violences policières written above in black, white and red.	

== Plaques and signs ==
=== United States ===
Plaque	City	State	Removal announced	Removed	Means of removal	Notes	Ref.
University of Alabama Confederate Army plaques	Tuscaloosa	Alabama	June 8	June 9	Removed by school	The three plaques near the library commemorate University students who joined the Confederate military and University cadets who helped defend the campus. The University stated that they "will be placed at a more appropriate historical setting".	
Historic sign saying Bowling Green was the Confederate capital of Kentucky	Bowling Green	Kentucky	Not announced	About August 25	Removed by Western Kentucky University administration		
Plaque and stone that honored Stephen Douglas	Chicago	Illinois		Announced June 7	Removed by owner, University of Chicago		
John H. Winder plaque	Salisbury	Maryland	June 12	June 12	Removed by Wicomico County	The plaque was located next to the Wicomico County Courthouse. It was personally removed by Wicomico County officials.	
Words engraved at the base of the Hannah Duston statue	Haverhill	Massachusetts	April 27, 2021		Removal approved by Haverhill City Council	City Council voted to leave the statue in the park, but to remove the hatchet and words inscribed in the statue's granite base describing Native Americans as savages.	
Woodrow Wilson's desk as Governor (plaque)	Trenton	New Jersey		Announced July 2	No longer being used by Phil Murphy, Governor of New Jersey		
Maryland State House plaque	Annapolis	Maryland	June 15		Removal approved by Maryland State House Trust	The plaque was installed during the Civil Rights Movement. It honors Marylanders who fought on both sides of the Civil War; the plaque claims not to "take sides".	
Plaques honoring Simon Baruch and Alexander Stephens Plaques honoring Matthew Fontaine Maury and Maupin-Maury House Plaque honoring surgeon John Syng Dorsey Cullen	Richmond	Virginia	July 16		Committee at Virginia Commonwealth University recommends these changes; approval expected.	Various plaques commemorating members of the Confederacy placed across University	

=== United Kingdom ===
Plaque		Location	Removal announced	Removed	Means of removal	Notes	Ref.
Plaque to Sir Thomas Picton	Sir Thomas Picton blue plaque	Haverfordwest	—	Jun 10, 2020	Removed at the request of the building's owner	Blue plaque at the birthplace of the general and governor of Trinidad. The building's owner had the plaque removed due to fears that it could be targeted by protesters. It was reported that the plaque would be displayed in Haverfordwest Town Museum from 2021.	
Plaque to Thomas Phillips		Brecon	—	Before Jun 11, 2020	Removed by an unknown person	Plaque unveiled at Captain's Walk in 2010; it marked the site of the house of Thomas Phillips (c. 1665–1713), captain of the Hannibal slave ship. Brecon Town Council had already agreed to a review of the plaque, but it was removed by an unknown person before any decision about its fate could be made.	
Plaque to Sir Edward Codrington	Sir Edward Codrington blue plaque	Brighton	—	Jun 12, 2020	Removed by the building's managing agent	Blue plaque marking the residence of Sir Edward Codrington at Codrington Mansion, Western Road.	

== Buildings ==
The following buildings were destroyed, torn down, or heavily damaged during the George Floyd protests due to their perceived racist heritage:

Building		City	State	Date of incident	Notes	Ref.
Market House	Market House Building	Fayetteville	North Carolina	May 30	The Market House Building, a tourist attraction and museum on the site of a former slave market, was set on fire by demonstrators chanting "Black Lives Matter". The demonstrators used wood pallets to encourage a larger fire.	
Memorial to the Women of the Confederacy	Memorial to the Women of the Confederacy	Richmond	Virginia	May 31	The national headquarters of the United Daughters of the Confederacy was set on fire. Windows were broken and fire set to the curtains hanging in the building's main library. Flames covered most of the front of the building; 9 fire trucks responded. Firefighters asked for and received police protection. There was extensive smoke and water damage throughout the building and charring on the building's Georgia marble façade. All the books in the library incurred some damage and library shelving was destroyed. Some Stonewall Jackson memorabilia, including his Confederate flag, were destroyed.	
Old Market House		Louisville	Georgia	Pending	The structure is a former slave market; it was built in 1795 and is located in the downtown area of Louisville. The Old Market House is listed on the National Register of Historic Places as one of the few surviving slave markets in the United States and the sole surviving market in Georgia. In July 2020, a fourteen-person commission was established by the city to determine the structure's future. The commission voted unanimously to remove the building; this decision was re-affirmed by the Louisville City Council on August 11, 2020. The city wishes to move the Old Market House to a museum, although no formal plan has been approved.	

== See also ==
- Decolonization of public space
- Actions against memorials in Great Britain during the George Floyd protests
- Canadian Indian residential school gravesites § Reactions
- Cultural Revolution, removal of capitalist and traditional Chinese symbolism following the Chinese Communist Revolution
- Decommunization in Ukraine, a similar campaign of monument and memorial removals in Ukraine since 2014
- Denazification, removal of Nazi symbols in Germany after World War II
- Iconoclasm, the social belief in the importance of the destruction of icons and other images or monuments
- List of monument and memorial controversies in the United States
- List of public statues of individuals linked to the Atlantic slave trade
- Removal of Confederate monuments and memorials
- Rhodes Must Fall
