= Putnam County Confederate Memorial =

United Daughters of the Confederacy erected statue

Coordinates: 29.6471°N 81.6327°W

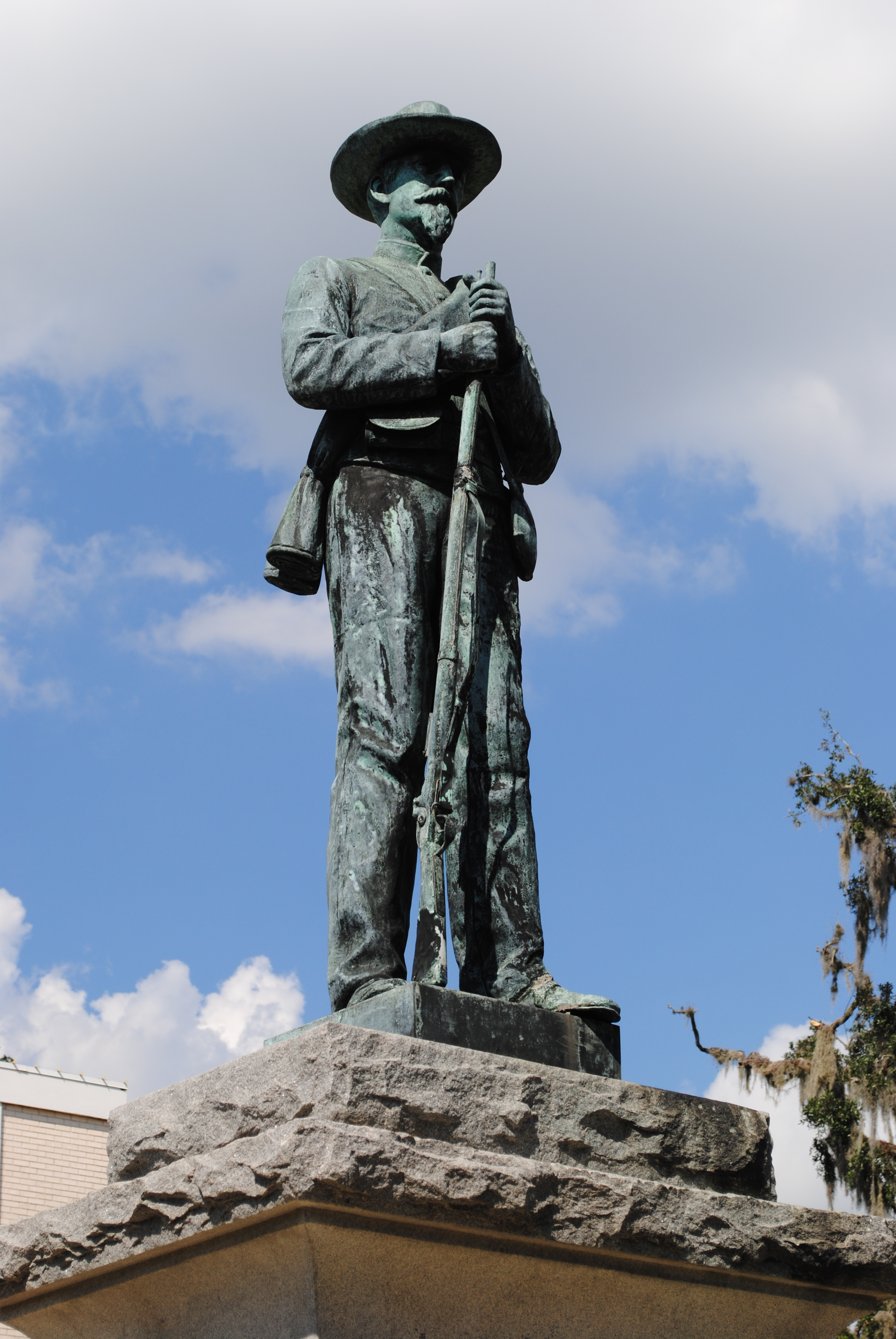
- Year: 1924
- Subject: American Civil War
- Location: Palatka, Florida

The Putnam County Confederate Memorial was erected in 1924 by the Patton Anderson Chapter, United Daughters of the Confederacy. On August 25, 2020, the Putnam County Commissioners voted 4–1 to remove it. Where it will be moved to was not decided at that meeting.

In November 2020, the board decided that the statue would be relocated to Putnam County Veterans Memorial Park but only if $200,000 in private funds was raised within 90 days from people inside of Putnam County.

== See also ==
- List of monuments and memorials removed during the George Floyd protests
