= Nash County Confederate Monument =

Confederate memorial in Rocky Mount, North Carolina,

- Location: Rocky Mount, North Carolina, U.S.
- Coordinates: 35.96213°N 77.80544°W
- Type: Confederate Monument
- Completion date: 1917
- Dismantled date: 2020

The Nash County Confederate Monument was a Confederate memorial in Rocky Mount, North Carolina, United States. The monument was removed in 2020.

== See also ==
- List of monuments and memorials removed during the George Floyd protests
