= Statue of Christopher Columbus (Columbus, Wisconsin) =

Statue in Columbus, Wisconsin

- Subject: Christopher Columbus
- Location: Columbus, Wisconsin; 43.348929°N 89.037200°W

A painted, fiberglass statue of Christopher Columbus was prominently installed for more than 30 years on public land in Columbus, Wisconsin, United States. Following public debate stemming from a petition initiated by a 15-year-old city resident, the statue was removed and placed into storage in July 2020.

== See also ==
- List of monuments and memorials to Christopher Columbus
- List of monuments and memorials removed during the George Floyd protests
