= Christopher Columbus Monument (West Orange, New Jersey) =

- Subject: Christopher Columbus
- Location: West Orange, New Jersey, U.S.

The Christopher Columbus Monument in West Orange, New Jersey is slated for removal, as of June 2020.

== See also ==
- List of monuments and memorials to Christopher Columbus
- List of monuments and memorials removed during the George Floyd protests
