= Statue of Christopher Columbus (Waterbury, Connecticut) =

Statue in Waterbury, Connecticut, U.S.

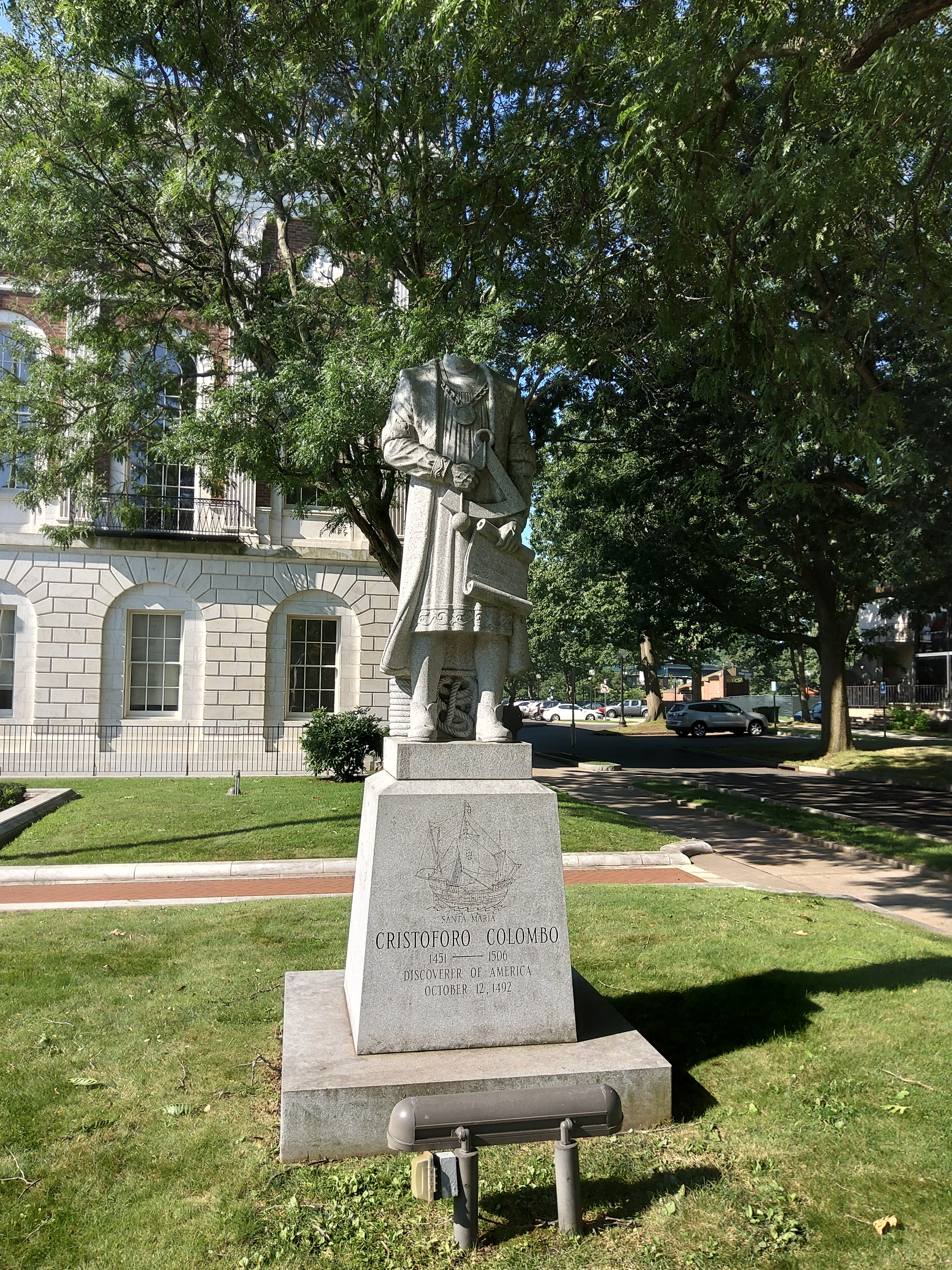
- The statue in August 2020
- Subject: Christopher Columbus
- Location: Waterbury, Connecticut, U.S.; 41.55529°N 73.0463°W

A statue of Christopher Columbus was installed in Waterbury, Connecticut in 1984. It was decapitated in July 2020 amid protests.

== Restoration ==
The Columbus monument was repaired in December 2020, it cost $8,800 to repair the statue. One person was arrested for the decapitation after he was found trying to sell Columbus's nose online.

== See also ==
- List of monuments and memorials to Christopher Columbus
- List of monuments and memorials removed during the George Floyd protests
