= Statue of Benjamin Welch Owens =

Confederate memorial in the United States

- Interactive map of Statue of Benjamin Welch Owens
- Location: Lothian, Maryland
- Coordinates: 38°49′14.16″N 76°39′49.08″W
- Dedicated to: Benjamin Welch Owens

The statue of Benjamin Welch Owens is a memorial statue that was formerly in Lothian, Maryland, United States. It was erected in 1999 to honor Benjamin Welch Owens, a Marylander who fought for the Confederate States of America in the American Civil War. It was vandalized in June 2020 and toppled in July 2020.

== History ==
Benjamin Welch Owens was a private from West River, Maryland, whom served in the 1st Maryland Flying Artillery Confederate artillery unit during the American Civil War. During the Battle of Middleburg, Owens' unit was tasked with holding a railway bridge and he kept his cannon firing despite most of his compatriots being injured or killed. By doing this, Owens was credited with holding back the Union forces during the battle. General Robert E. Lee dubbed it "The Thermopylae of the War" and listed Owens on the Confederate Roll of Honor. After the war, Owens returned to Maryland and became a county clerk before dying in 1917. He was posthumously awarded the Confederate Medal of Honor by the Sons of Confederate Veterans.

In 1999, a man called Carter Shepherd announced that he wanted to erect a monument to honor Owens for his bravery. It was eventually constructed on private ground by Mt. Calvary Anglican Church in Lothian. In June 2020, during the George Floyd protests, the statue was vandalized by slogans being spray painted on it. The next month, the statue was vandalized again with it being pulled off its concrete pedestal. It was then placed into storage but then re-erected in 2025 at the Point Lookout Confederate Memorial Park.

== See also ==
- List of monuments and memorials removed during the George Floyd protests
