= Norfolk Confederate Monument =

Confederate memorial in Norfolk, Virginia, U.S.

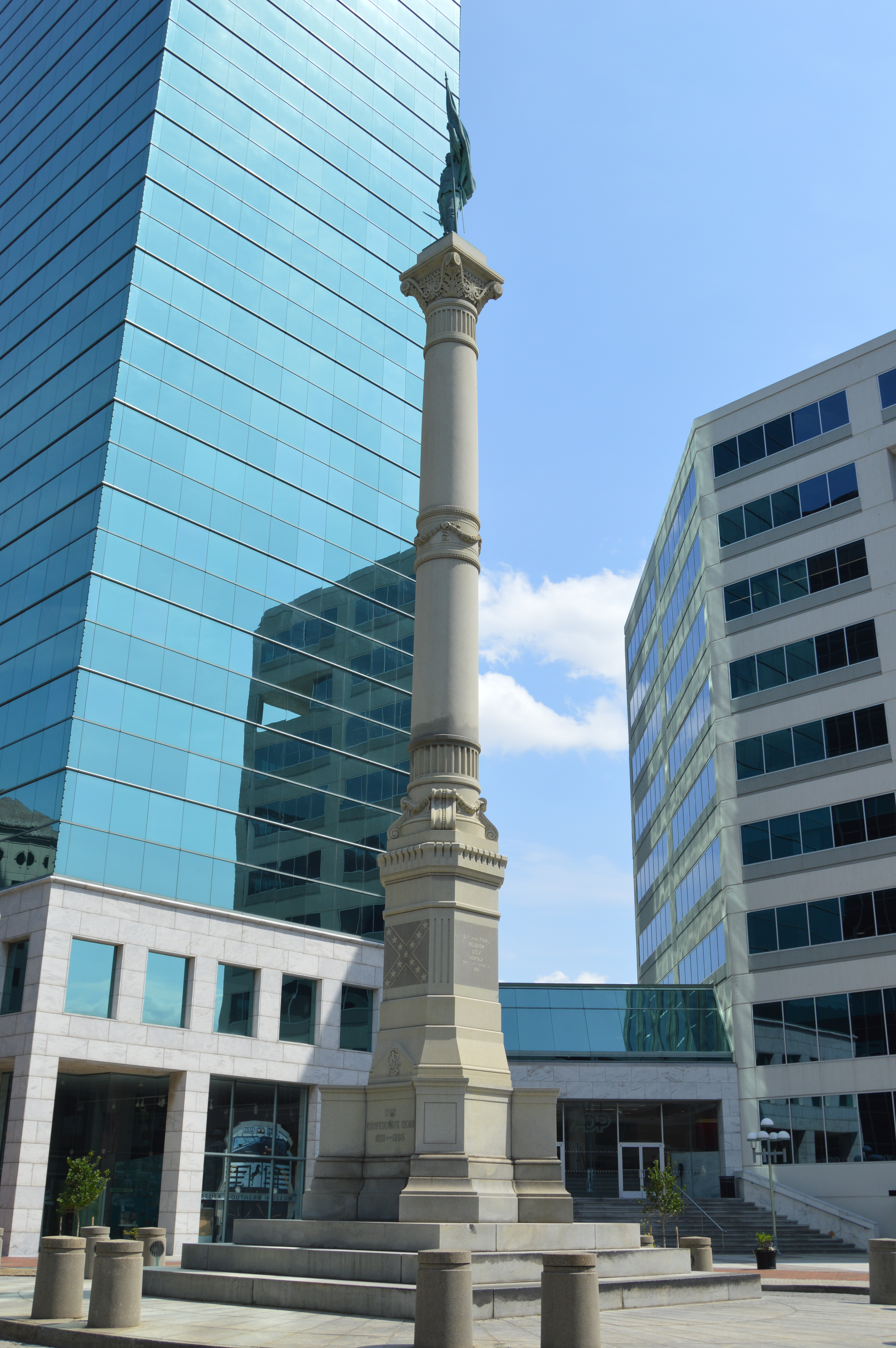
- The monument in 2017
- Artist: J. D. Couper and William Couper
- Year: 1907
- Subject: Confederate soldier
- Condition: Relocated to Elmwood Cemetery
- Location: Norfolk Southern Museum; Norfolk, Virginia, U.S.; 36°50′44.6″N 76°17′19.1″W

The Norfolk Confederate Monument was a Confederate memorial in front of the Norfolk Southern Museum in Norfolk, Virginia, United States. The monument was removed in June 2020.

== Description and history ==
The initiative to build the monument was taken by the United Daughters of the Confederacy, as one of many Confederate monuments they established throughout the country. Construction of the monument began on February 22, 1898, when the cornerstone was laid; it was completed in 1907 and dedicated on May 16 that year. The artists involved were J. D. Couper (designer) and William Couper (sculptor) from Couper Marble Works. It features the text "Our Confederate Dead, 1861–1865", the letters "CSA" (from "Confederate States of America"), a Confederate battle flag, and the statue of an unidentified Confederate soldier, who is often referred to as "Johnny Reb". The monument was removed in 1965 to make room for the construction of the Virginia National Bank, but reinstalled six years later in 1971 at about 150 feet from its original location.

=== Removal ===
In the 21st century, there were several calls and legal attempts to have the monument removed, and it was vandalized at least once. In early June 2020, during the George Floyd protests, the Norfolk City Council announced plans to remove the Norfolk Confederate Monument by August 2020. The Downtown Norfolk Council announced that it would no longer clean the monument.

On June 12, 2020, the "Johnny Reb" statue was removed by crane from the top of the monument under orders of Norfolk Mayor Kenny Alexander. Mayor Alexander acknowledged that the state law allowing the monument to be removed had not yet gone into effect. The removal was expedited because of public safety concerns after a protester sustained life-threatening injuries in neighboring Portsmouth days earlier after being hit by a falling statue during protests against the Portsmouth Confederate Monument. Crews later dismantled the 60 foot marble column. Mayor Alexander said the "Johnny Reb" statue would be put into storage, and an upcoming hearing would determine the future location of the monument. The monument was then relocated to the Elmwood Cemetery north of downtown Norfolk, where it was reconstructed minus the column that made up the middle section.

== See also ==
- List of monuments and memorials removed during the George Floyd protests
