= Gadsden Confederate Memorial =

Former monument in Gadsden County, Florida

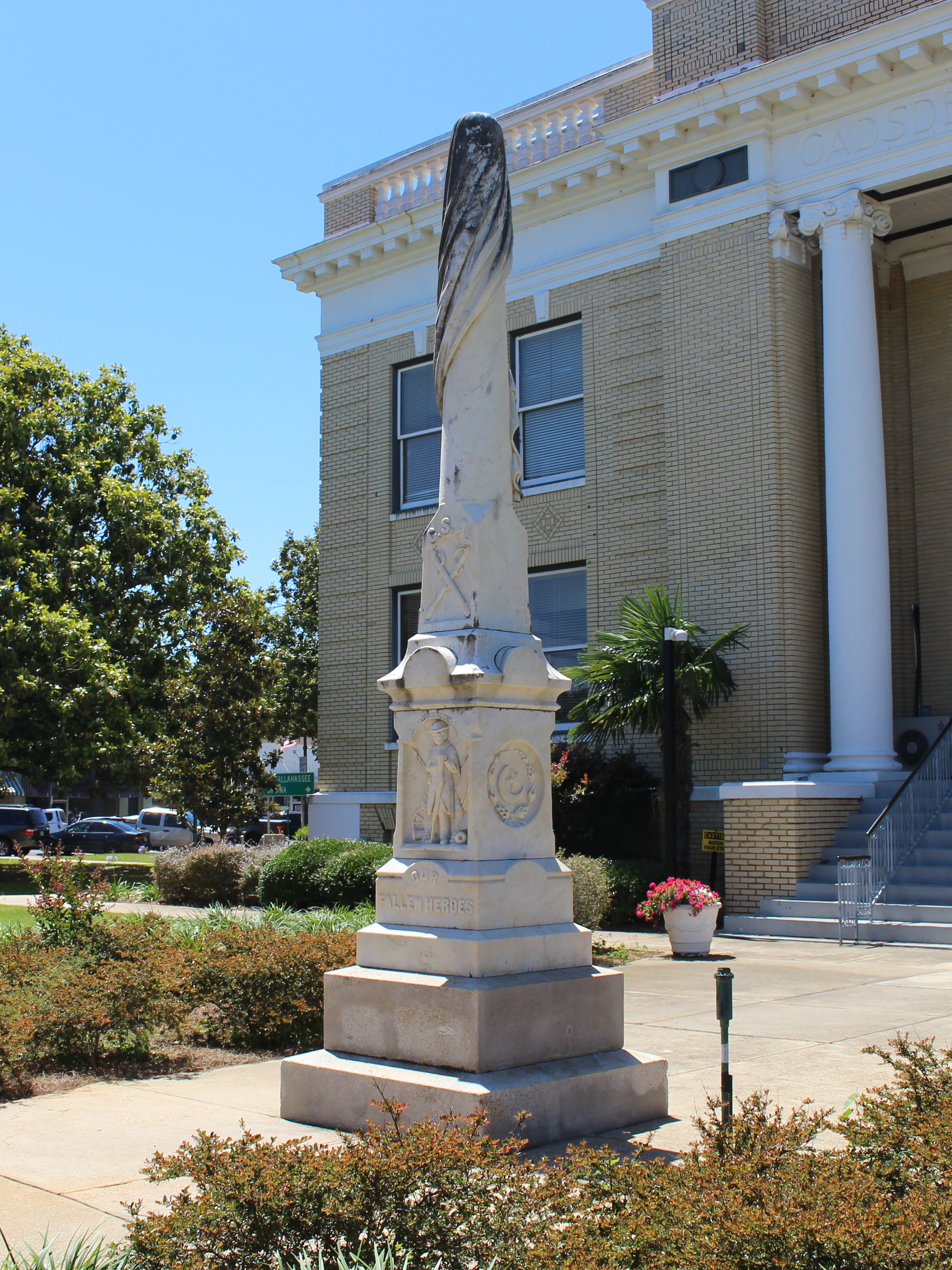
- The memorial in 2017
- Location: Quincy, Florida, U.S.
- Coordinates: 30.58890°N 84.57638°W
- Type: Confederate Memorial
- Dismantled date: June 2020

The Gadsden Confederate Memorial was installed in Quincy, Florida, United States. The memorial was removed in June 2020.

== See also ==
- List of monuments and memorials removed during the George Floyd protests
