= Our Confederate Soldiers =

Confederate monument in Beaumont, Texas

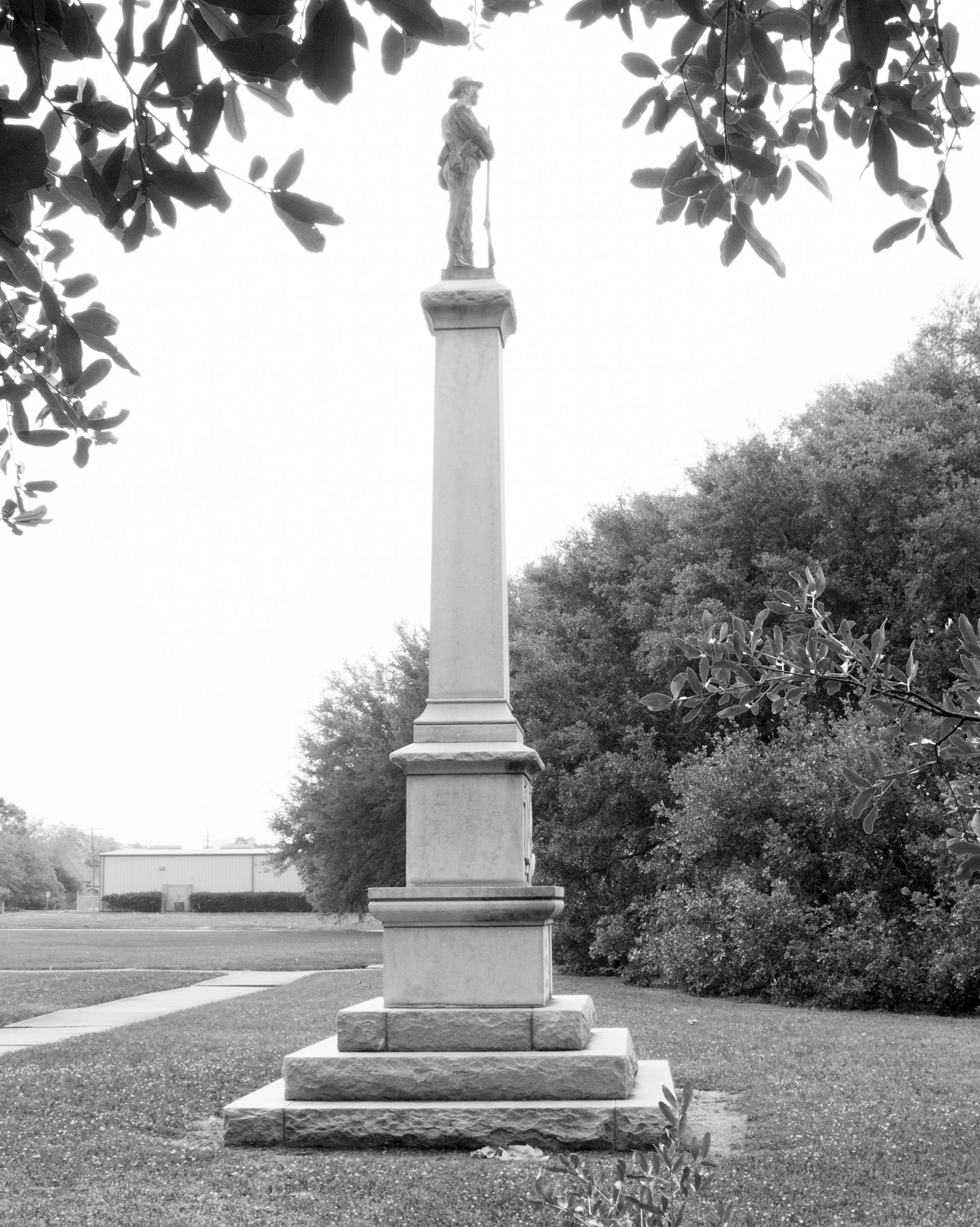
- Location: Beaumont, Texas, U.S.

Our Confederate Soldiers is a Confederate monument in Beaumont, Texas, United States. The memorial was removed and put into storage on June 29, 2020, in the wake of the George Floyd protests.

== History ==
The statue was created in 1912, and placed in Keith Park. In 1926, it was moved to Wiess Park, a few miles away. The statue had to be repaired in 1986 after a storm knocked it over, and was put back on the pedestal.

== See also ==
- List of monuments and memorials removed during the George Floyd protests
