= Statue of Christopher Columbus (Trenton, New Jersey) =

Public statue in New Jersey, US

- Subject: Christopher Columbus
- Location: Trenton, New Jersey, U.S.; 40.2149°N 74.7476°W

Statue of Christopher Columbus was installed at Christopher Columbus Park in Trenton, New Jersey, United States. The memorial was removed in July 2020.

== See also ==
- List of monuments and memorials to Christopher Columbus
- List of monuments and memorials removed during the George Floyd protests
