= Statue of Josephus Daniels =

- Interactive map of Statue of Josephus Daniels
- Location: Raleigh, North Carolina, U.S.
- Coordinates: 35°46′41″N 78°38′32″W
- Height: 8 feet (2.4 m)
- Opening date: 1985
- Dedicated to: Josephus Daniels
- Dismantled date: June 16, 2020

A statue of Josephus Daniels, the former publisher of the Raleigh News and Observer, was installed in 1985 at the east-facing edge of Raleigh, North Carolina's Nash Square, in the United States. Sculptor, Janos Farkas in Greensboro was commissioned.

== Description and history ==
The 8-foot (2.4 m) likeness stood on a 4-foot (1.2m) granite pedestal. It portrayed Daniels "in his trademark rumpled three-piece suit, holding his wide-brimmed hat at his left side and raising his right hand in the air as if waving to a friend peering out a second-floor window" of the News and Observer offices which were located across the street at the time of the installation. Daniels was a prominent white supremacist, and the building the statue was facing was scheduled for demolition, so the family decided on its own to remove the statue on June 16, 2020, and place it in storage.
