= Statue of Christopher Columbus (Atlantic City, New Jersey) =

Statue in Atlantic City, New Jersey, U.S.

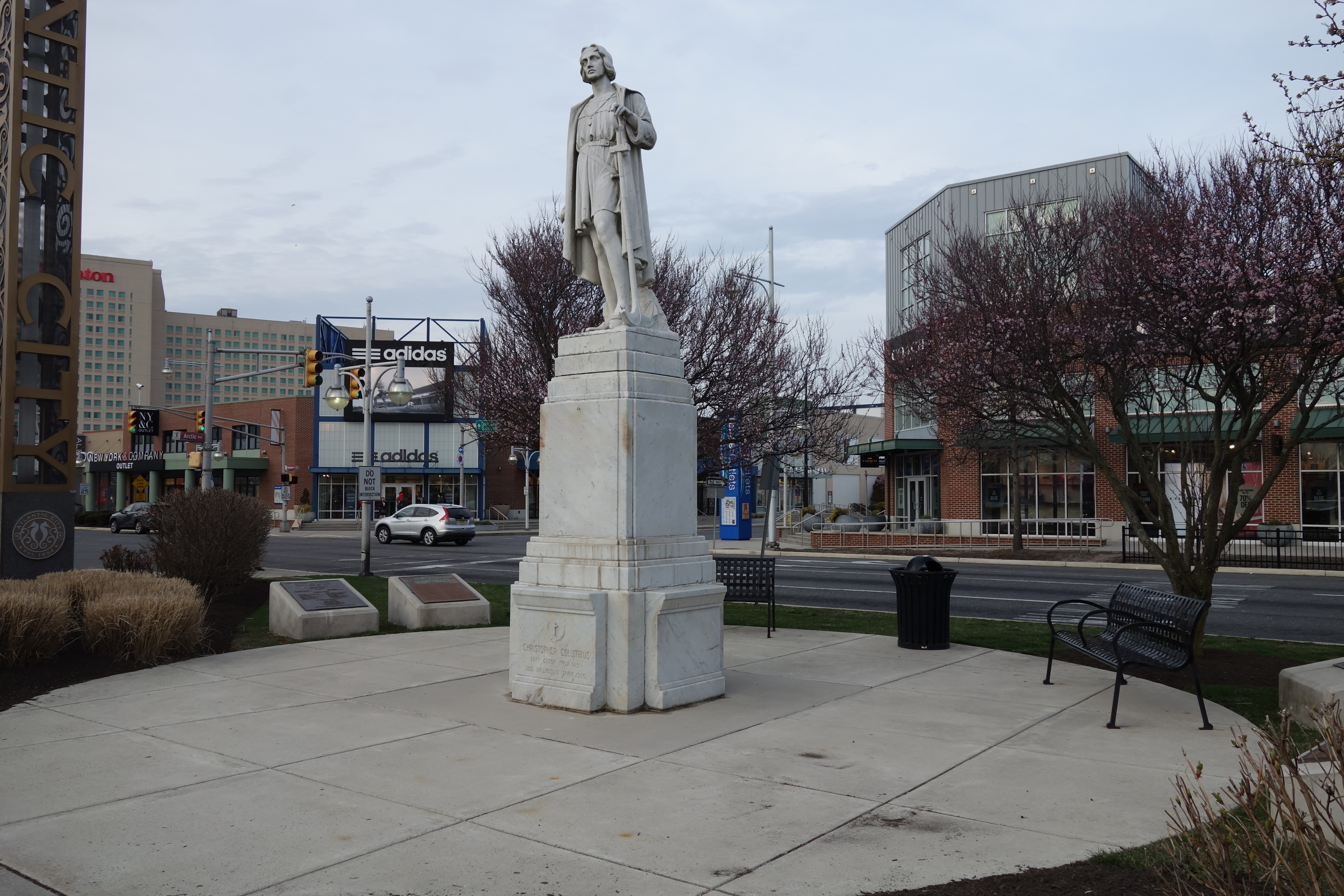
- Subject: Christopher Columbus
- Location: Atlantic City, New Jersey, U.S.; 39.3583°N 74.4366°W

A statue of Christopher Columbus is installed in Atlantic City, New Jersey, United States. The memorial is slated for removal, as of June 2020.

== See also ==
- List of monuments and memorials to Christopher Columbus
