= Statue of Pierre Belain d'Esnambuc =

Former public statue in Fort-de-France, Martinique

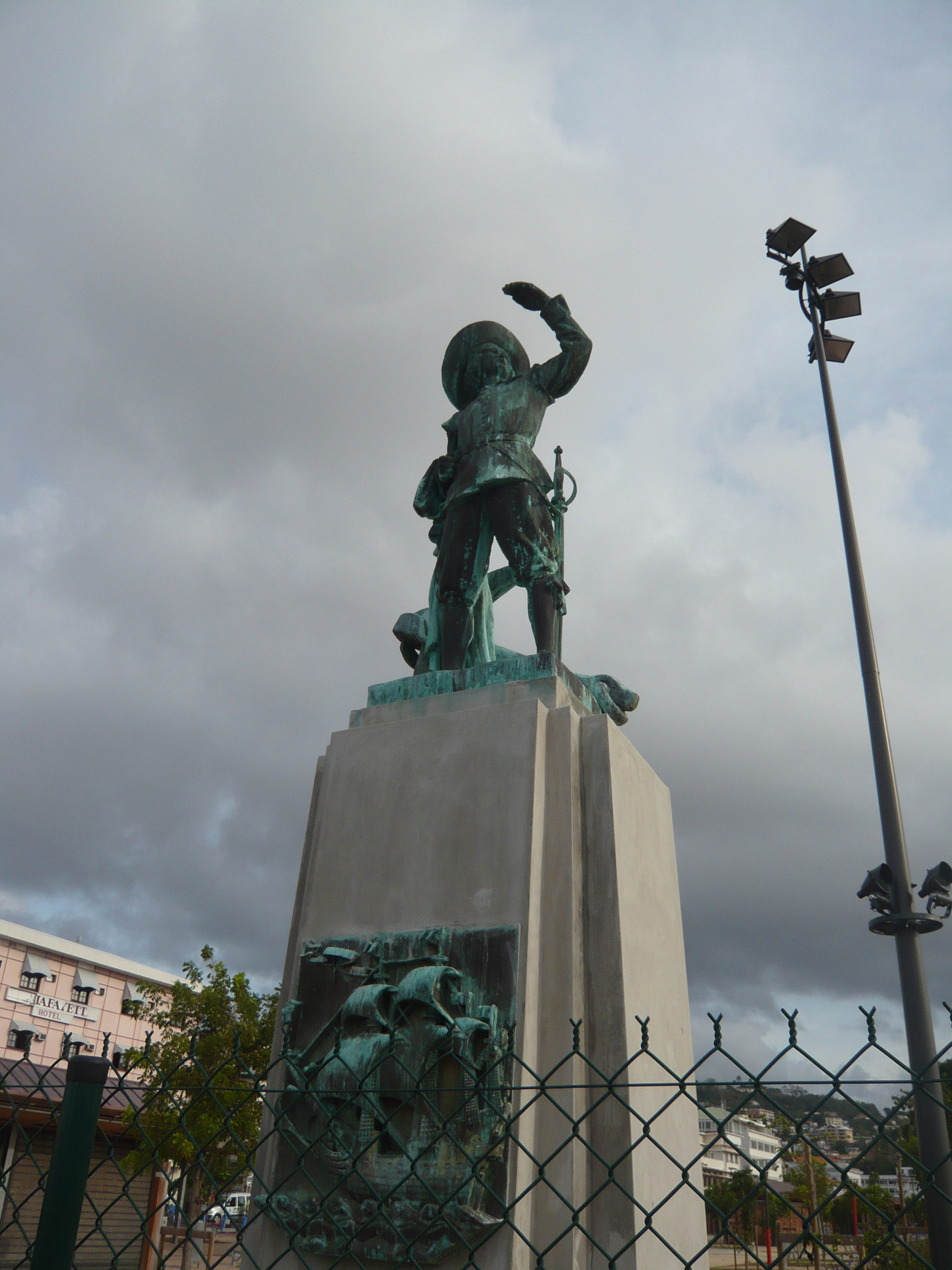
- Year: 2010
- Medium: Bronze sculpture
- Subject: Pierre Belain d'Esnambuc
- Location: Fort-de-France, Martinique

A statue of Pierre Belain d'Esnambuc was installed in Fort-de-France, Martinique, until 2020.
