= Equestrian statue of Sebastián de Belalcázar =

Statue formerly installed in Popayán, Colombia

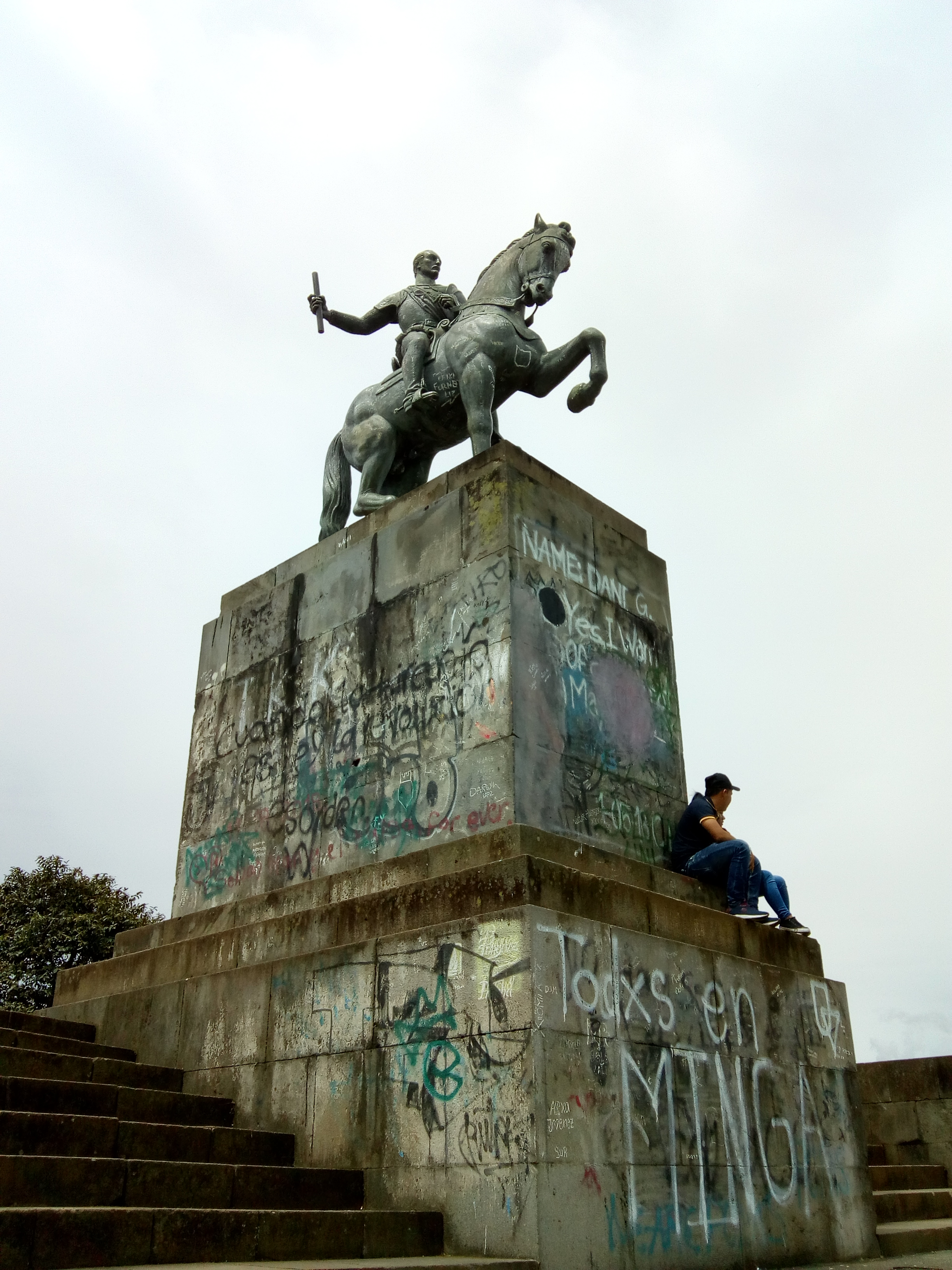
- The statue in 2019
- Subject: Sebastián de Belalcázar
- Location: Popayán, Colombia

An equestrian statue of Sebastián de Belalcázar was installed in Popayán, Colombia in the 1930s, until it was toppled by indigenous Guambiano protestors in 2020.

The statue was originally supposed to be repaired and put back on its original spot. However, the city of Popayán decided not to return the statue to its original spot. The decision was out of respect for the Misak people along with the possibility of future Vandalism. Due to concerns of possible damage to the pre-Hispanic pyramid under the pedestal, no other monument will take Belalcázar's place. The Statue is in storage and is being restored, with the head being made from the mold of Sebastián de Belalcázar statue in Cali. Its future placement has not been decided.
