= Statue of Pete Wilson =

Statue in San Diego, California, U.S.

Pete Wilson
- The statue in 2016
- Medium: Bronze sculpture
- Subject: Pete Wilson
- Location: San Diego, California, U.S.; 32°42′53″N 117°09′45″W

Pete Wilson is a bronze sculpture depicting California governor Pete Wilson, installed on private property outside San Diego's Horton Plaza Park, on 225 Broadway in the U.S. state of California. The statue, which cost $200,000, was dedicated in 2007. Approximately 500 people attended the ceremony.

In the fall of 2020, after George Floyd’s murder, the Pete Wilson statue was removed.

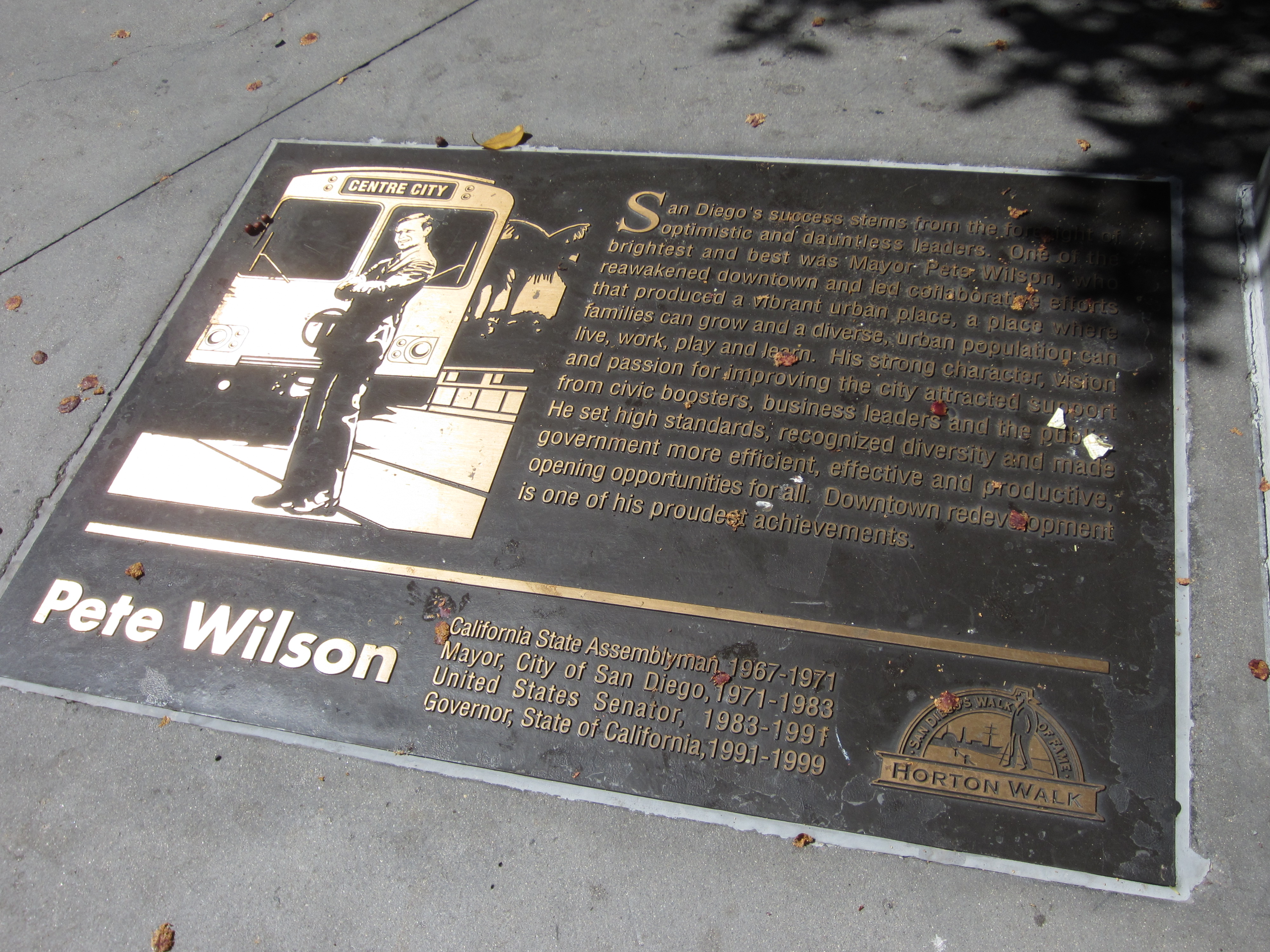
Plaque
