= Robert E. Lee Memorial (Roanoke, Virginia) =

Monument commemorating Robert E. Lee in Roanoke, Virginia

- Interactive map of Robert E. Lee Memorial
- Location: Roanoke, Virginia
- Coordinates: 37°16′14″N 79°56′43″W
- Type: Memorial
- Height: 10 feet
- Opening date: October 1960
- Dedicated to: Robert E. Lee
- Dismantled date: July 22, 2020

The Robert E. Lee Memorial was a monument commemorating Robert E. Lee, formerly installed in Roanoke, Virginia's Lee Plaza. The granite memorial was approximately 10 feet (3.0 m) tall and was erected by the William Watts Chapter of the United Daughters of the Confederacy on October 4th, 1960, just as the first two black students were enrolled in the all-white school system. The monument's erection coincided with the run up to the centennial of the Civil War in 1961.

In June 2020, the Roanoke City Council voted to start the legal process to remove the monument and rename Lee Plaza after the July 1, 2020 date when a new state law did away with the prohibition against removing monuments to the Confederate States of America. The new law gave permission for localities to remove war memorials on public property with the stipulation that they hold a vote and find a new home for the memorial.

On just before midnight July 22, 2020, the monument was found to be torn down and broken into two pieces. A 70-year-old man named William Foreman, who was caught vandalizing the monument the night before it was torn down, was arrested on July 24, 2020, and eventually pleaded guilty to a misdemeanor. Lee Plaza was renamed Lacks Plaza after Henrietta Lacks, an African-American woman whose cells are the source of the first immortalized human cell line, and who was born in Roanoke. A statue of Lacks was unveiled in the plaza on October 4, 2023. Roanoke's vice-mayor White-Boyd and the Harrison Museum of African American Culture led the fundraising for the statue and for spreading awareness through public history initiatives.

Evergreen Burial Park submitted a proposal to the Roanoke City Council, to relocate the monument to the burial park that was accepted by the council. The proposed location for the re-erecting the statue is at the east end of the park adjacent to the flagpole dedicated to the Space Shuttle Challenger Disaster.

== See also ==
- List of Confederate monuments and memorials in Virginia
- List of memorials to Robert E. Lee
