= Haverfordwest Town Museum =

Local history museum in Haverfordwest, Wales

Coordinates: 51.802515°N 4.97097°W

Haverfordwest Museum
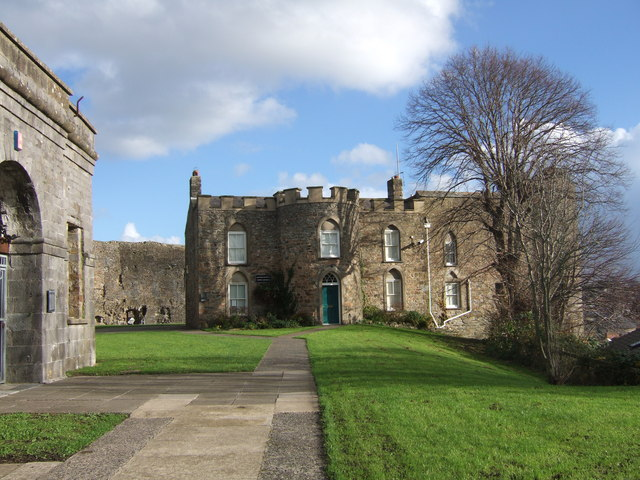
- Location: Haverfordwest, Pembrokeshire,
- Type: Local Heritage, Social History
- Curator: Simon Hancock.
- Website: www.haverfordwest-town-museum.org.uk

Haverfordwest Museum is a local history and heritage museum in Haverfordwest, Pembrokeshire. Collections include local and social history, the history of the castle, and a selection of local art. The museum is housed in the former governor's house, a Grade II listed building, said to date from 1779 inside Haverfordwest Castle and facing the former town prison.

In 2012 Pembrokeshire County Council decided to sell the current site for use commercially, and relocate the museum to another site. The site has not been sold and As of February 2025 the museum is closed "temporarily". In November 2023 the roof of the museum was damaged by lead thieves.
