= Pioneer Park (San Francisco) =

Park atop Telegraph Hill in San Francisco, California, U.S.

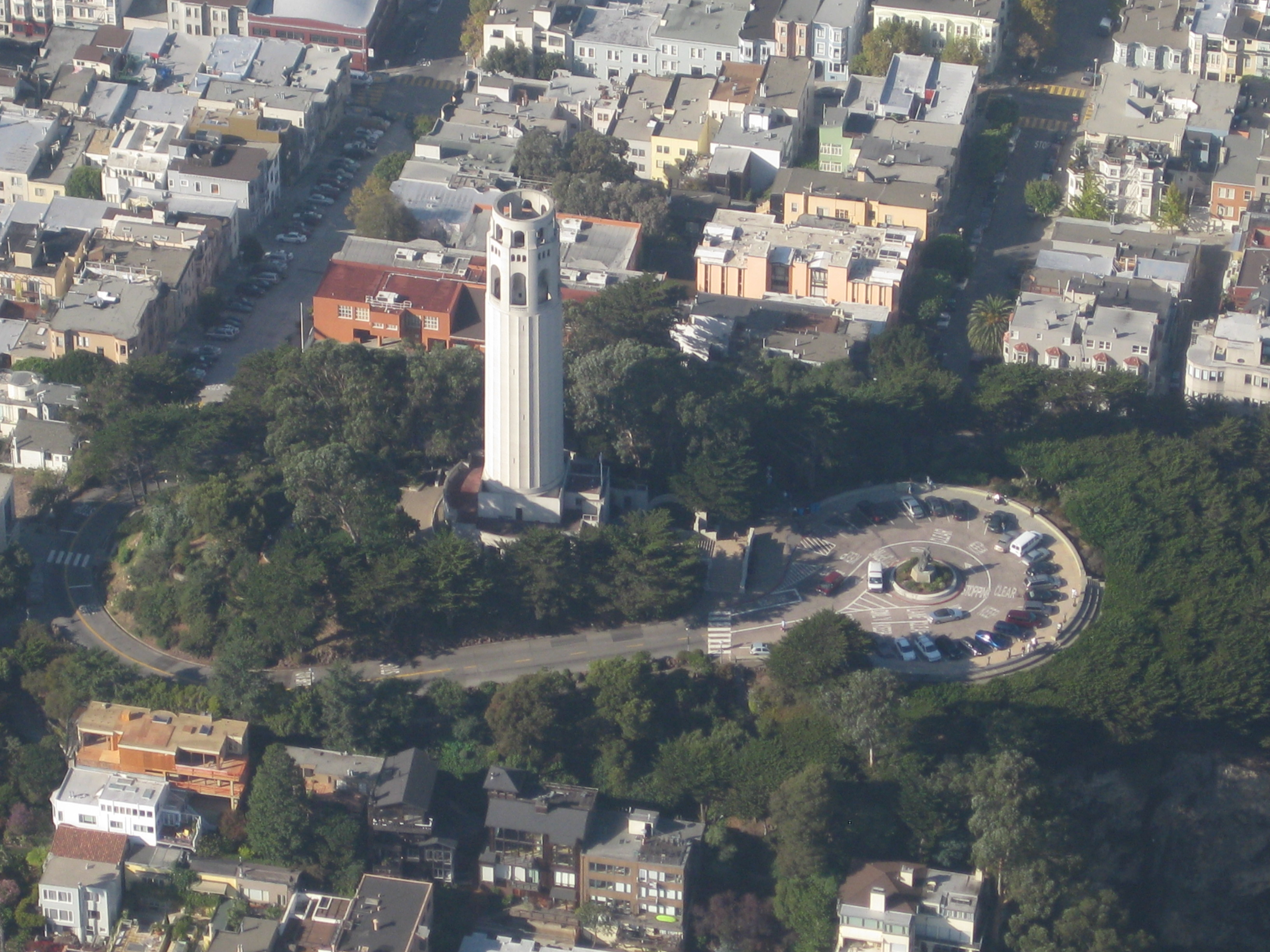
- Aerial view of Pioneer Park and Coit Tower
- Interactive map of Pioneer Park
- Type: Municipal (San Francisco)
- Location: Telegraph Hill, San Francisco
- Coordinates: 37°48′09″N 122°24′22″W
- Area: 4.82 acres (1.95 ha; 0.00753 mi^{2}; 0.0195 km^{2})
- Created: 1876
- Owner: San Francisco Recreation & Parks Department
- Operator: San Francisco Recreation & Parks Department
- Open: All year, 5 a.m. to Midnight
- Website: Official website

Pioneer Park is a 4.82-acre (1.95 ha) public park crowning the top of Telegraph Hill in San Francisco, California. It was established in 1876 in celebration of the United States Centennial. Prior to establishment of the park, it was the site of the Marine Telegraph Station. The main feature of the park, Coit Tower, was completed in 1933 using a $118,000 bequest left to the city by Lillie Hitchcock Coit in 1929. A bronze statue of Christopher Columbus was placed in the park in 1957, and removed in June, 2020.

== History ==
After a storm destroyed the Marine Telegraph Station at the top of Telegraph Hill in 1876, George Hearst purchased the property and donated it to the city under the stipulation that the land be dubbed "Pioneer Park." Later purchases by the city substantially added to the park's size. To engage the public, an observatory and bar was built on the property in the style of a German castle. The venture was unsuccessful and ultimately closed after a fire in the early 1900s. In 1902, the North Beach Improvement Club, California Club, and California Art League together lobbied the city to preserve the land. The city responded by adding roads increasing public access.

In 1924, Lillie Hitchcock Coit passed, leaving the city with $118,000. The money was ultimately used to construct Coit Tower, the primary feature of the park.
