= Mather, Tuolumne County, California =

Unincorporated community in California, United States

Mather, California
- Unincorporated community
- Location within California Location within the United States
- Coordinates: 37°52′56″N 119°51′21″W
- Country: United States
- State: California
- County: Tuolumne
- Elevation: 4,521 ft (1,378 m)
- Time zone: UTC-8 (Pacific (PST))
  - Summer (DST): UTC-7 (PDT)
- Area code: 209
- GNIS feature ID: 263264

Mather is an unincorporated community in Tuolumne County, California, United States. Mather is 33 miles (53 km) west of Tioga Pass. The community is named after Stephen Tyng Mather, who directed the National Park Service from 1917 to 1929. It is home to Camp Mather, operated by San Francisco Recreation & Parks Department.
