= Floride Green =

American photographer (1863–1936)

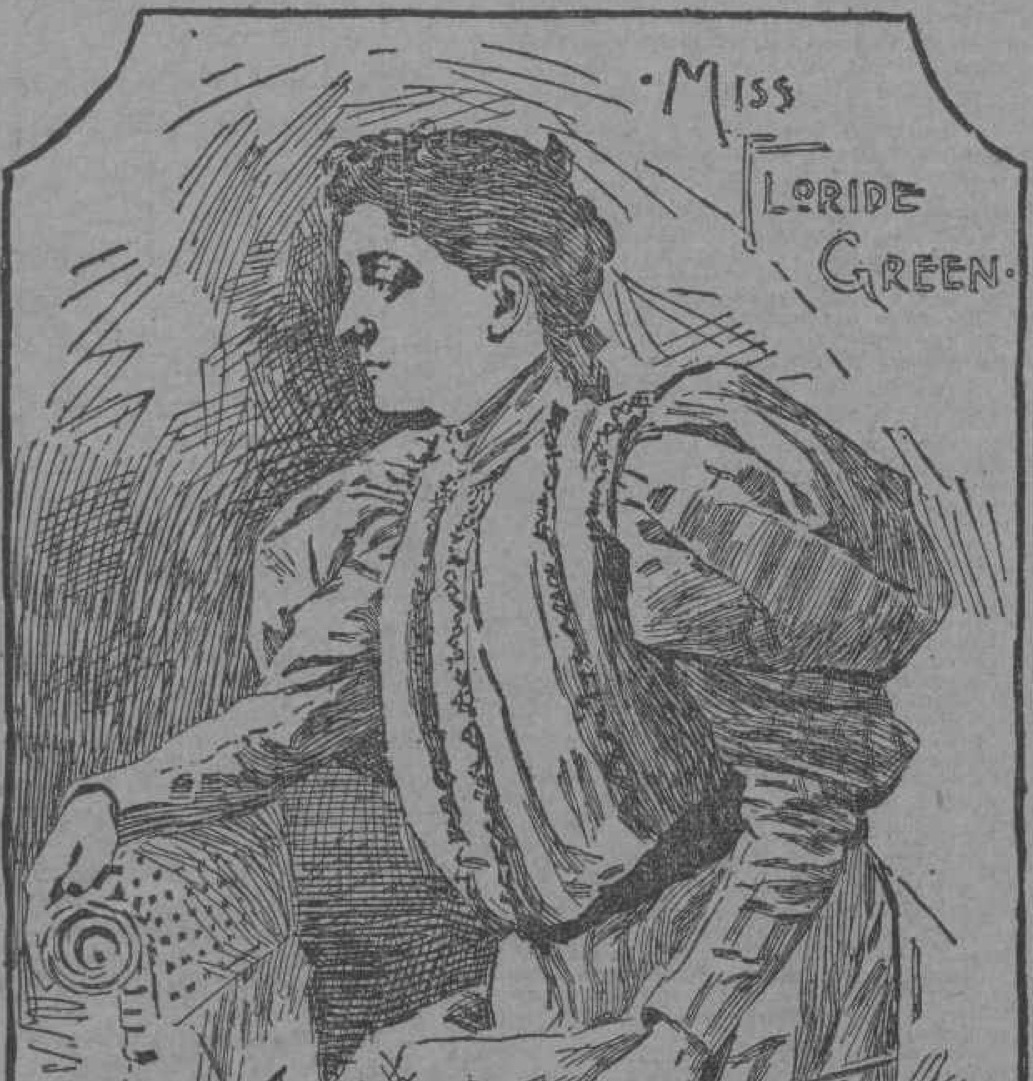
- Drawing of Floride Green, 1896
- Born: 1863; Alabama, US
- Died: October 24, 1936 (aged 72–73); San Francisco
- Occupation: Photographer

Floride Green (1863 – October 24, 1936) was an American photographer.

Floride Green was born in either Eutaw, Alabama, or Mobile in 1863 to Rebecca (Pickens) and Duff Green. Her family moved to Stockton, California, in 1872, after the South lost the American Civil War, and Floride was educated in California. She graduated from a normal school in 1883 and began working as a teacher. While teaching school in San Francisco, she took up amateur photography. According to a history of Alabama photography, however, she took her first photographs on a visit to Alabama to see family. Green met Lillie Hitchcock Coit in high school in St. Helena, California, and later published a book about Coit titled Some Personal Recollections of Lillie Hitchcock Coit.

Green came to New York around 1897, where she started a photography business with a studio at 28 West 30th Street, Manhattan. She specialized in photographs taken inside her subjects' homes, which required special attention to light. Before taking photographs of children at their homes, she would make a preliminary visit to determine the best time of day to take their portrait. Reportedly, her photographs of Black people in the South were transferred to slides and shown in Europe. Her work was also shown at a 1900 exhibit of women's photography at the Exposition Universelle.

She died on October 24, 1936, at the Dante Sanitarium in San Francisco.
