= Statue of Christopher Columbus (Miami) =

Statue in Miami, Florida, U.S.

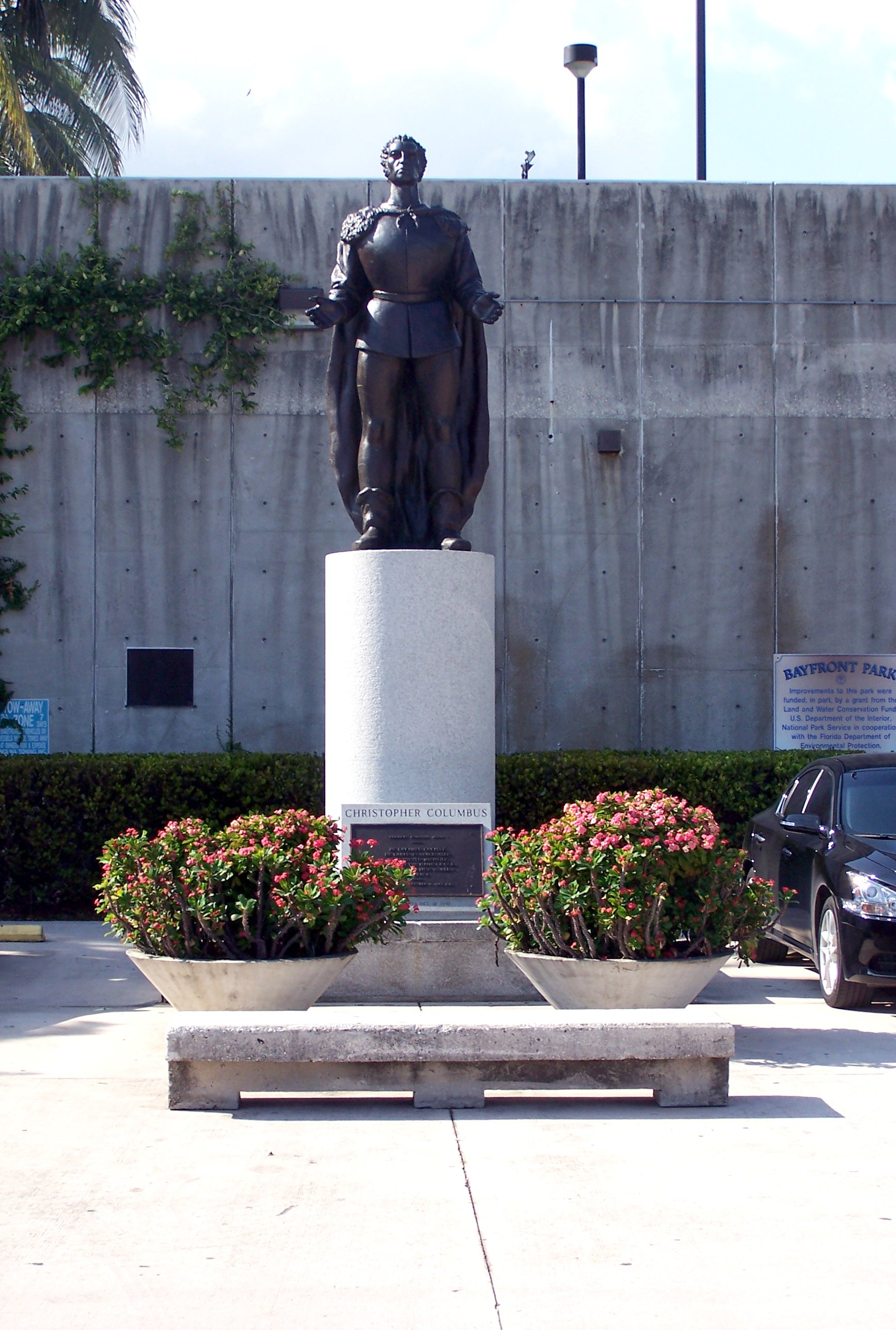
- The statue in 2010
- Subject: Christopher Columbus
- Location: Miami, Florida, U.S.; 25°46′35″N 80°11′06″W
- Website: statues.vanderkrogt.net

A statue of Christopher Columbus stands in the Bayfront Park of Miami, Florida, United States.

== History ==
The statue itself was sculpted by Count Vittorio di Colbertaldo (1902-1979) of Verona, one of Benito Mussolini's hand picked ceremonial bodyguards known as the "Black Musketeers." Colbertaldo doubled as the Musketeers's sculptor, producing statues which commemorated the organization. A second Columbus statue done by Colbertaldo was in San Francisco until its removal in 2020.

The statue was vandalized in June 2020 during the George Floyd protests.

== See also ==
- Statue of Christopher Columbus (San Francisco)
- List of monuments and memorials to Christopher Columbus
