= Statue of Christopher Columbus (San Francisco) =

Statue formerly installed in Pioneer Park, San Francisco, California, U.S.

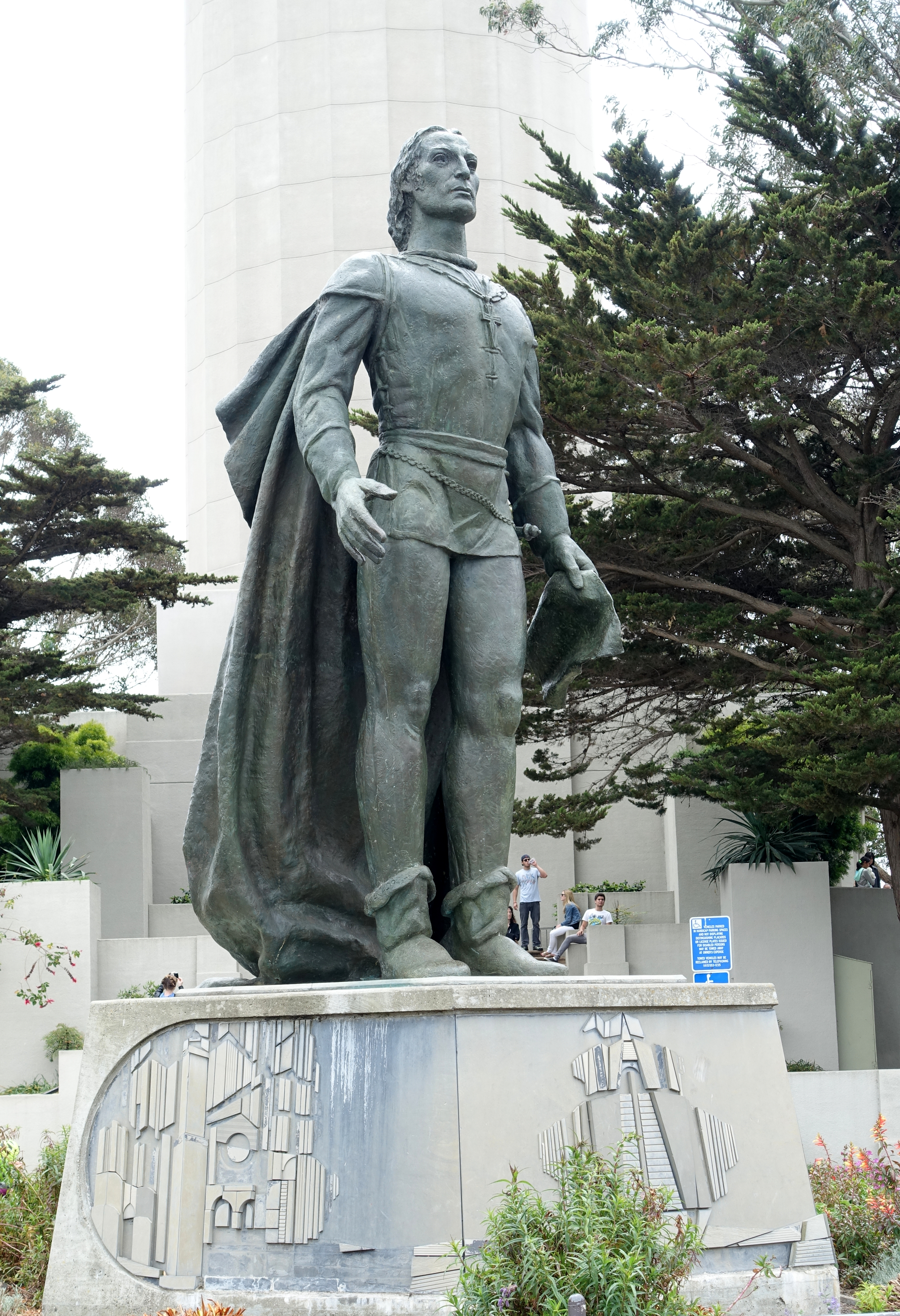
- The statue in 2015
- Artist: Count Vittorio di Colbertaldo
- Year: 1957
- Medium: Bronze
- Subject: Christopher Columbus
- Dimensions: 370 cm (12 ft)
- Weight: 2 ton
- Location: Telegraph Hill, San Francisco, California, U.S.; 37°48′10″N 122°24′22″W
- Owner: San Francisco

A statue of Christopher Columbus was installed in Pioneer Park, San Francisco, California.

== History ==
The statue was placed in the park in 1957, donated by the city's Italian-American community. The statue itself was sculpted by Count Vittorio di Colbertaldo (1902-1979) of Verona, one of Benito Mussolini's hand picked ceremonial bodyguards known as the "Black Musketeers." Colbertaldo doubled as the Musketeers's sculptor, producing statues which commemorated the organization. The statue in Pioneer Park was cast in Verona and then shipped to San Francisco. A second Columbus statue done by Colbertaldo is in Miami's Bayfront Park.

=== Vandalism and removal ===
In 2019, the statue was doused in red paint as an act of protest. The restoration cost about $70,000.

On June 18, 2020, the San Francisco Arts Commission (SFAC) removed the statue following the removal of other controversial statues during the George Floyd protests. Rachelle Axel of the SFAC has said that the statue was removed as it "doesn't align with San Francisco's values or our commitment to racial justice" and in light of recent threats on social media to throw the statue off Pier 31 and into the San Francisco Bay. Further, it was put forward that Columbus is not an appropriate historic symbol to the area or to the United States of America because he never set foot on the respective soils. After its removal the statue was put in storage for preservation and possible relocation.

== See also ==
- Statue of Christopher Columbus (Miami)
- List of monuments and memorials to Christopher Columbus
- List of monuments and memorials removed during the George Floyd protests
