= Camp Mather (San Francisco Recreation and Parks) =

San Francisco Sierra Summer Camp

Coordinates: 37.88°N 119.86°W

Camp Mather is the 337-acre (136 ha) Sierra Nevada family summer camp in Mather, California, run by the San Francisco Recreation & Parks Department which welcomes nearly 10,000 campers each summer. Founded in 1923, the camp opened in 1924 and offers nearly three months of week-long camping experiences each year.

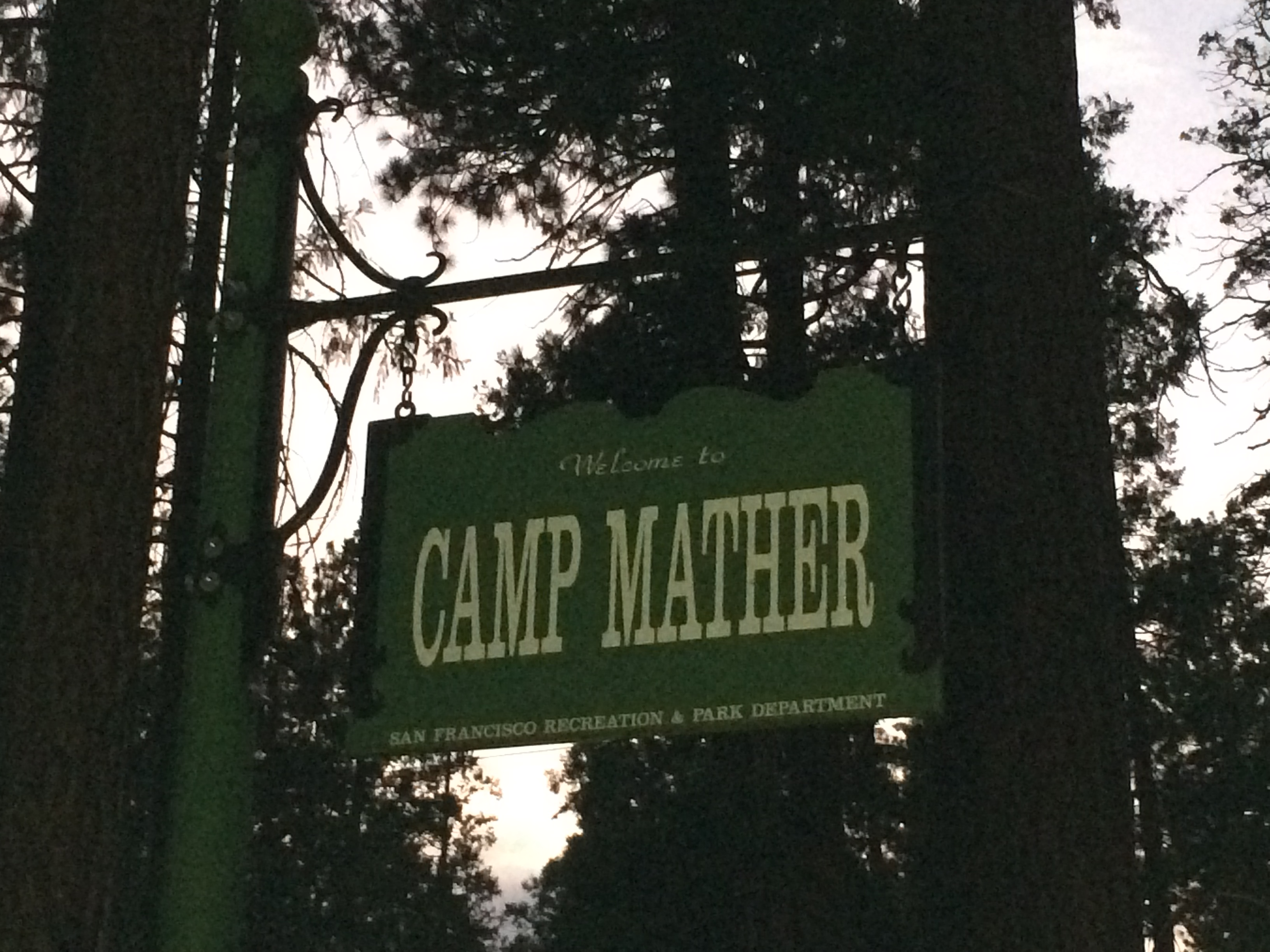
Camp Mather Sign 2022

== Area history ==
The area now known as Camp Mather [elevation 4,520 feet (1,380 m)] was originally inhabited by the Miwok people. Dozens of acorn mortar sites suggest the connection between the Miwok and this parcel of land goes back 2,000 to 10,000 years.

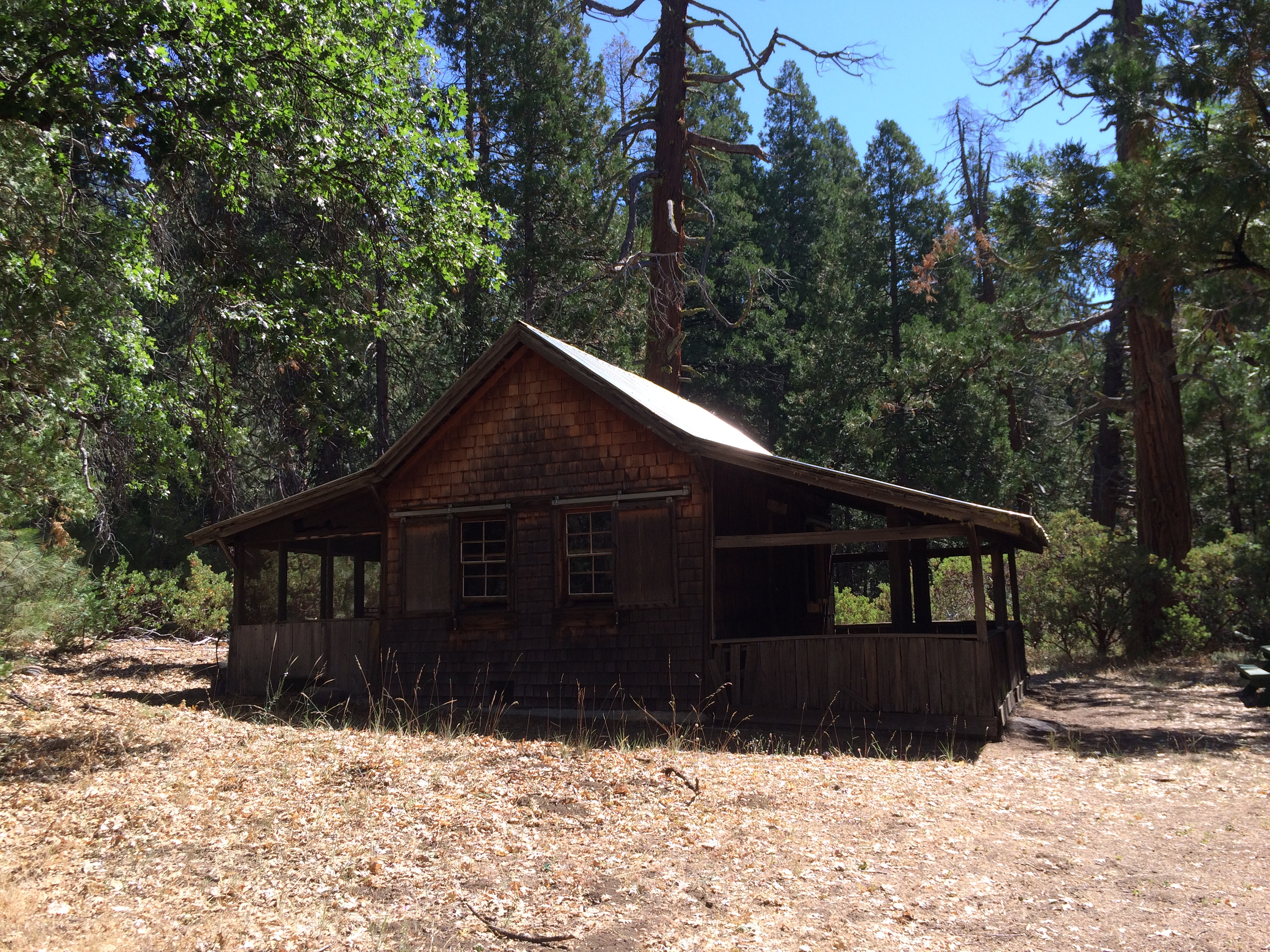
The Hog Ranch Cabin at Mather in 2022

Cyrill Carpenter Smith (1827-1900) and his brother, Dorilas (1835-1882) (Note: The names Cyrill and Dorilas are seen with double "L" and single "L" spellings. "Dorillus" appears as an unusual form. This article uses the preferred spellings as used by the Friends of Camp Mather.) arrived in the area around 1853, and secured rights to the property under certificates of preemption. Cyrill homesteaded his property in 1884. Cyrill's sister-in-law homesteaded her husband's property. Cyrill originally bought the property, which included Hetch Hetchy Valley and the camp's northwest corner. The Smith brothers purchased their property from the federal government for $1.25 per acre. Cyrill built a log cabin on the property, which still stands. (Note: The City of San Francisco recognizes his "Hog Ranch" cabin as the oldest structure owned by the city.) The brothers acquired additional property and Cyrill later bought out his brother. The property ownership moved to Cyrill's son, Elmer E. Smith, when Cyrill died in 1900.

The brothers raised sheep in Merced and grazed them on their Sierra property during the spring and summer months. Federally-owned land in the area was freely-available for grazing as well. It is presumed that hogs and bacon sold at their Sierra ranch resulted in the area's nickname, Hog Ranch. Seeking a reliable water supply, the City of San Francisco purchased their properties in 1909 for $550 per acre.

After Hog Ranch was purchased by the city, it was transformed into a lumber mill and railway station to support the construction of O'Shaughnessy Dam. The Hetch Hetchy Railroad reached the site in late 1917. The rail ran east–west through the camp and a branch line of the California Peach and Fig Growers Railroad ran to the south where lumber was harvested for packing boxes. A large pit was dug for gravel: it later filled in naturally to form Birch Lake.

== Camp development ==
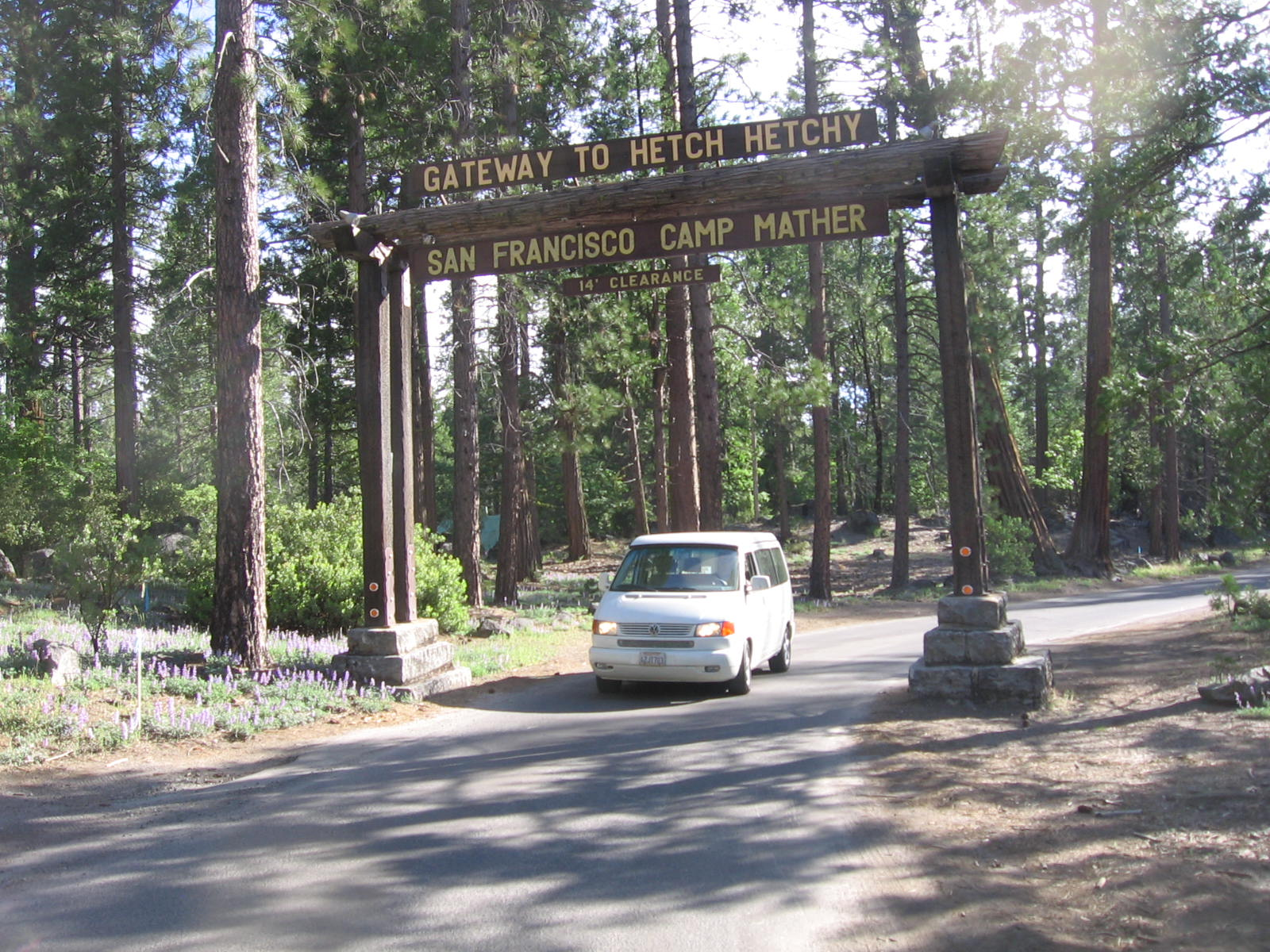
A camper drives through the entrance at Camp Mather in 2019

With the construction of the dam and lake, tourism was expected to flourish. The Hetch Hetchy Lodge obtained a 20-year lease to operate a lodge and cabins The Lodge was converted into a Dining Hall for the Camp in 1921. (Note: Service the first year was family style. After that, service has always been cafeteria style. The main room extended west from the façade. A large addition was added to the north which terminated in a large fireplace. The original room included seating at the west end which overlooked the meadow. Modifications cut off those windows and put a dish washing facility at the west end. A large deck was added to the north. Friends of Camp Mather installed awnings over many of the tables.) The Lodge operated from 1921 to 1923.

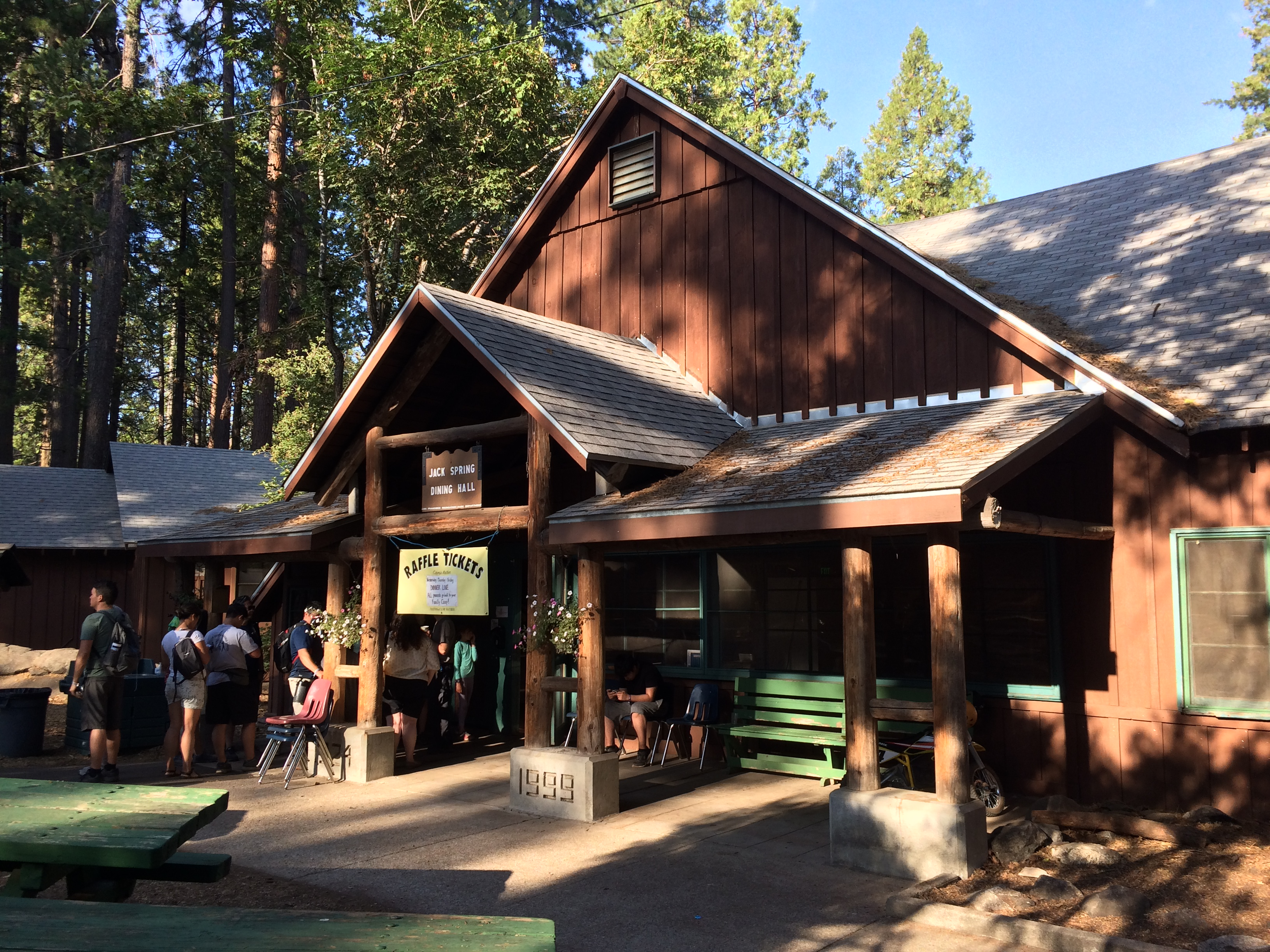
Jack Spring Dining Hall at Camp Mather 2022

Promotion of a city camp was led by groups of hikers as early as 1921.

In 1923, Mary Margaret Morgan, the first woman on the San Francisco Playgrounds Commission, promoted opening a Sierra summer camp similar to those provided by Berkeley and Oakland (later transferred to San Jose) to their residents. She insisted that the camp open in 1924. The camp was first called the Margaret Maryland Playground. The 328-acre camp opened on July 5, 1924, with 35 cabins from the sawmill era. Campers arrived after a 15-hour ferry and train trip from San Francisco.

The railroad station was first named Hog Ranch. The station was later named for Stephen Mather, the first director of the National Park Service. The camp then adopted the railroad station name. (Note: Unlike Mather Air Force Base which was named for Second Lieutenant Carl Spencer Mather, Camp Mather uses the short-A pronunciation of Mather ("Math-er"), because that's how Stephen T. Mather pronounced his name. The Air Force Base uses the long-A pronunciation of the name (May-ther), because that's how Carl Spencer Mather pronounced his name.)

Polling booths were moved from San Francisco to form the original camp cabins. (Note: Cabins 1 to 9, 11, 12, 14 to 34 and 47 are former San Francisco Polling Booths. These were set up on empty lots for voting. When voting machines came into use, the structures were declared surplus and moved to Camp Mather. Canvas roofs have been replaced with structural roofs.)

When San Francisco determined that there would be no water activities on the lake, the tourism dream was abandoned. When the City of San Francisco offered to take over the lease, the company that owned Hetch Hetchy Lodge quickly agreed, which added 22 cabins to the camp. (Note: Cabins 25 to 50 are noted for their central peaked roofs and casement windows on either side of the door.)

The Carnegie Cabin was built in 1926 for Dr. Harvey Monroe Hall who conducted studies of growing plants at various elevations. The cabin's elevation of 4,610 feet (1,410 m) was one of three elevations tested.

The Recreation Commission recommended improvements at Camp Mather in the amount of $3.1 million in 1933.

Campsites were also introduced prior to 1993.

Ten "new", larger lakeside cabins were added in 1955. (Note: Cabins 99 to 120 are the larger, newer duplex cabins at the southeast part of camp. Cabin 121-122 is a staff cabin of the same design.)

The 1996 Ackerson Fire, which burned large areas to the north and east of Camp Mather, closed the Camp mid-August that year.

Cabins #60 and #61 were replaced with a new design in 2001.

In 2003, the San Francisco Grand Jury recommended wider public outreach to San Francisco residents and full multi-language communications be made available. The Grand Jury recommended that efforts be made to make Camp Mather even more profitable for the Recreation and Parks Department.

In 2003, the Friends of Camp Mather (FoCM) was founded as a not-for-profit organization to support the camp.

Camps 1 to 9 were relocated between the summers of 2018 and 2019.

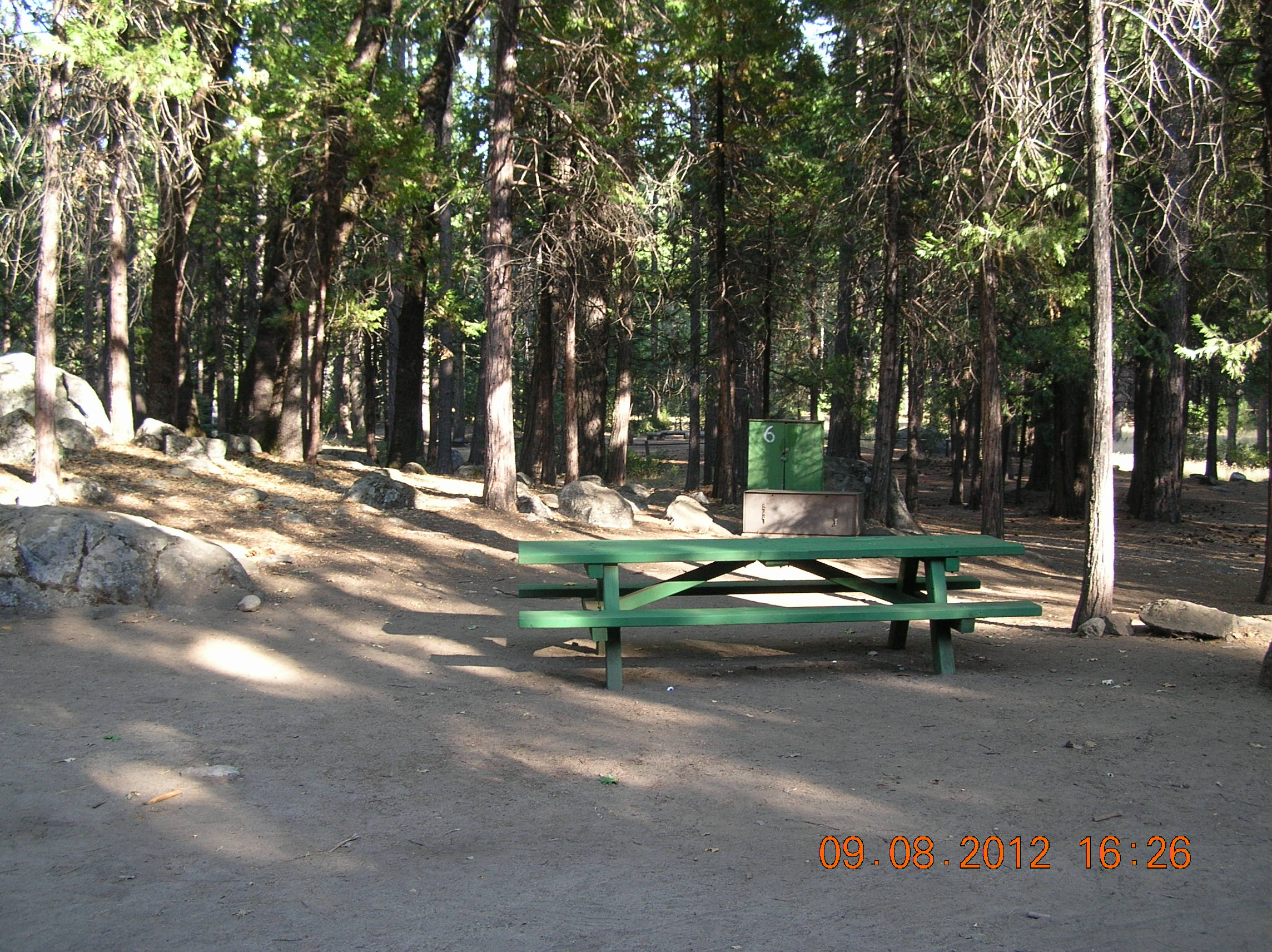
Camp Mather Campsite Number 6 in 2012

A viral outbreak thought to be norovirus affected campers and staff in 2011.

The Rim Fire burned to the edges of Camp Mather in 2013. Only one building was reported lost within the camp. The area which includes the Carnegie Cabin and Hog Ranch Cabin did not burn.

The seven-night camp week (Saturday to Saturday) was shortened to a six-night camp week (Sunday to Saturday) in 2016.

The camp's operations were impacted by a viral outbreak and the Ferguson Fire in 2018.

Two new single-story staff dormitory buildings were added at the east end of camp in 2019.

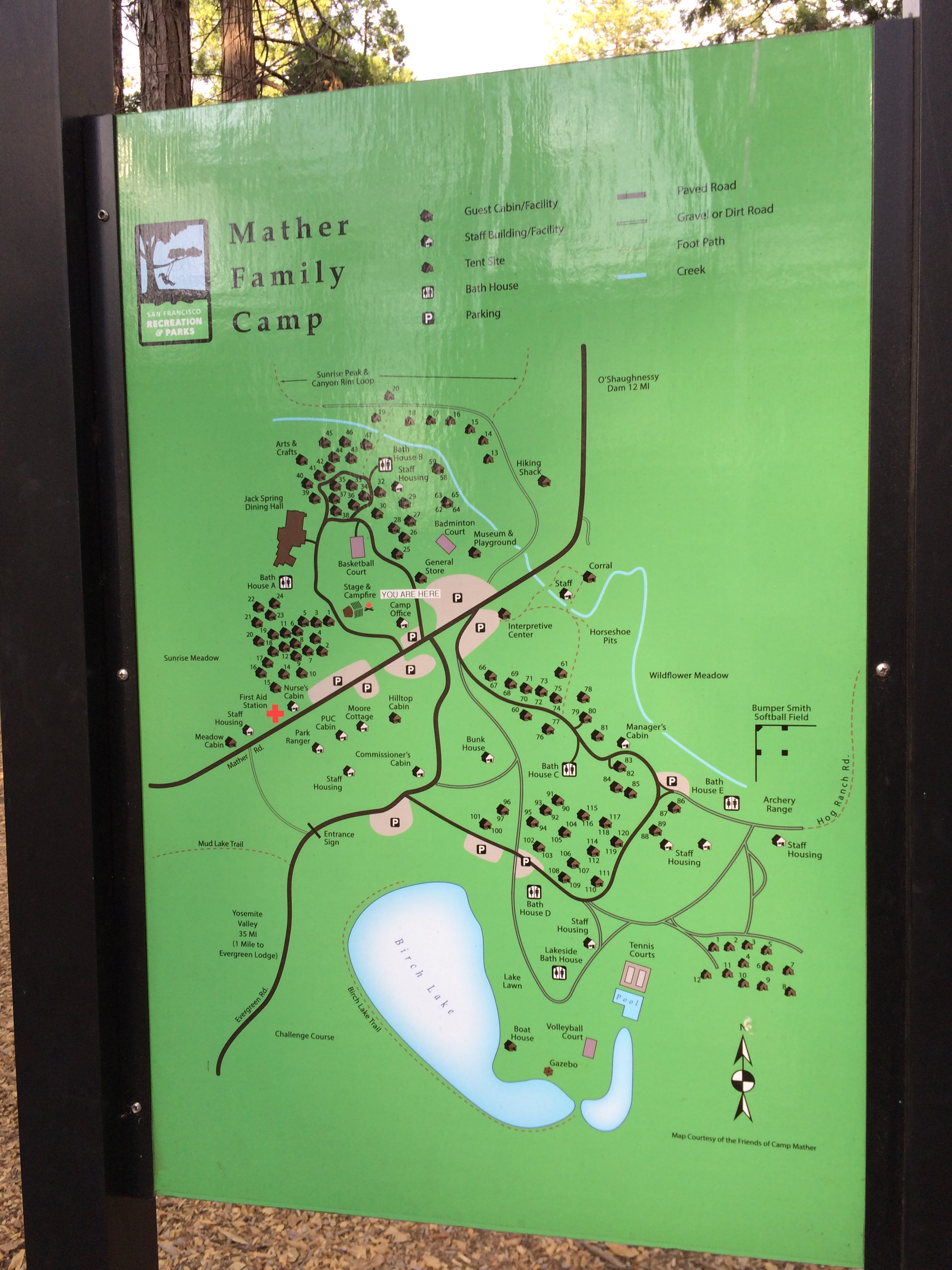
Camp Mather map as posted in 2022

The camp was closed during the years 2020 and 2021 because of the COVID-19 pandemic. Weeks 1, 4 and 5 (of 11 scheduled weeks) were lost during the summer of 2022 because of staff COVID-19 outbreaks. Part of an additional week was lost because of smoke from the Washburn Fire.

On July 5, 2024, the 100th birthday of the camp was celebrated.

== Activities ==
The camp is noted for an extensive program of activities. Crafts such as lanyard-making, friendship bracelet tying, shirt tie-dyeing and button-making have been offered. The staff and camper talent shows draw large crowds.

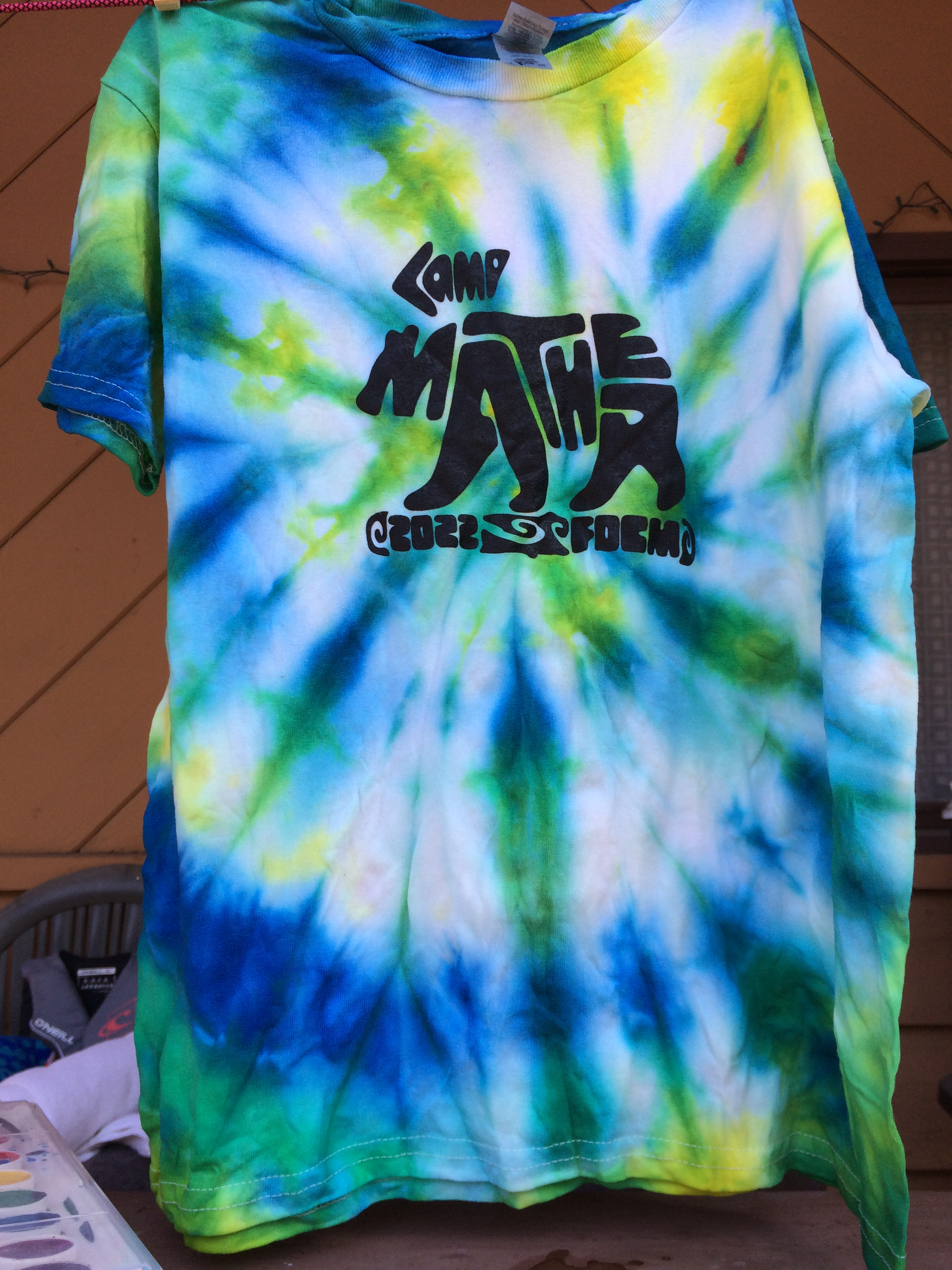
Camp Mather tee shirt 2022

Nature and historical hikes are offered by the naturalists. A ropes course offers several different challenges each day. A corral offered horse and pony rides on a concession basis through 2023. The swimming pool and Birch Lake are very popular with visitors: all open hours are staffed with multiple lifeguards.

Three full meals are provided in the dining hall each day.

== Camp participation ==
The camp is operated by the San Francisco Recreation and Parks Department. San Francisco residents and property owners have first priority for summer registration for seven-day, six-night stays. A lottery is held to assign cabins and place others on the wait list. In 2022, approximately 1,500 cabin registrations were awarded and nearly 1,000 applicants were placed on the waitlist. Free or lower-cost camping has been offered to enable participation by lower-income residents. Having operated for nearly a century, many families have come to Camp Mather for multiple generations.

Senior Camp, a short-week camp for senior citizens has been held at the beginning and/or end of the regular family camp season. Inclusion Week is held during the regular family camp season and is designed to accommodate and encourage the participation of people with disabilities.

7,000 people attended each of two long-weekend Strawberry Music Festivals which were held the Memorial Day and Labor Day weekends. These were held at Camp Mather from 1982 until 2013 when the Rim Fire affected camping conditions. Campers did not use the cabins, but extensive tent and RV camping was permitted.
