= North Point (San Francisco) =

Cape in San Francisco, United States of America

Coordinates: 37°48′38.45″N 122°24′38.34″W

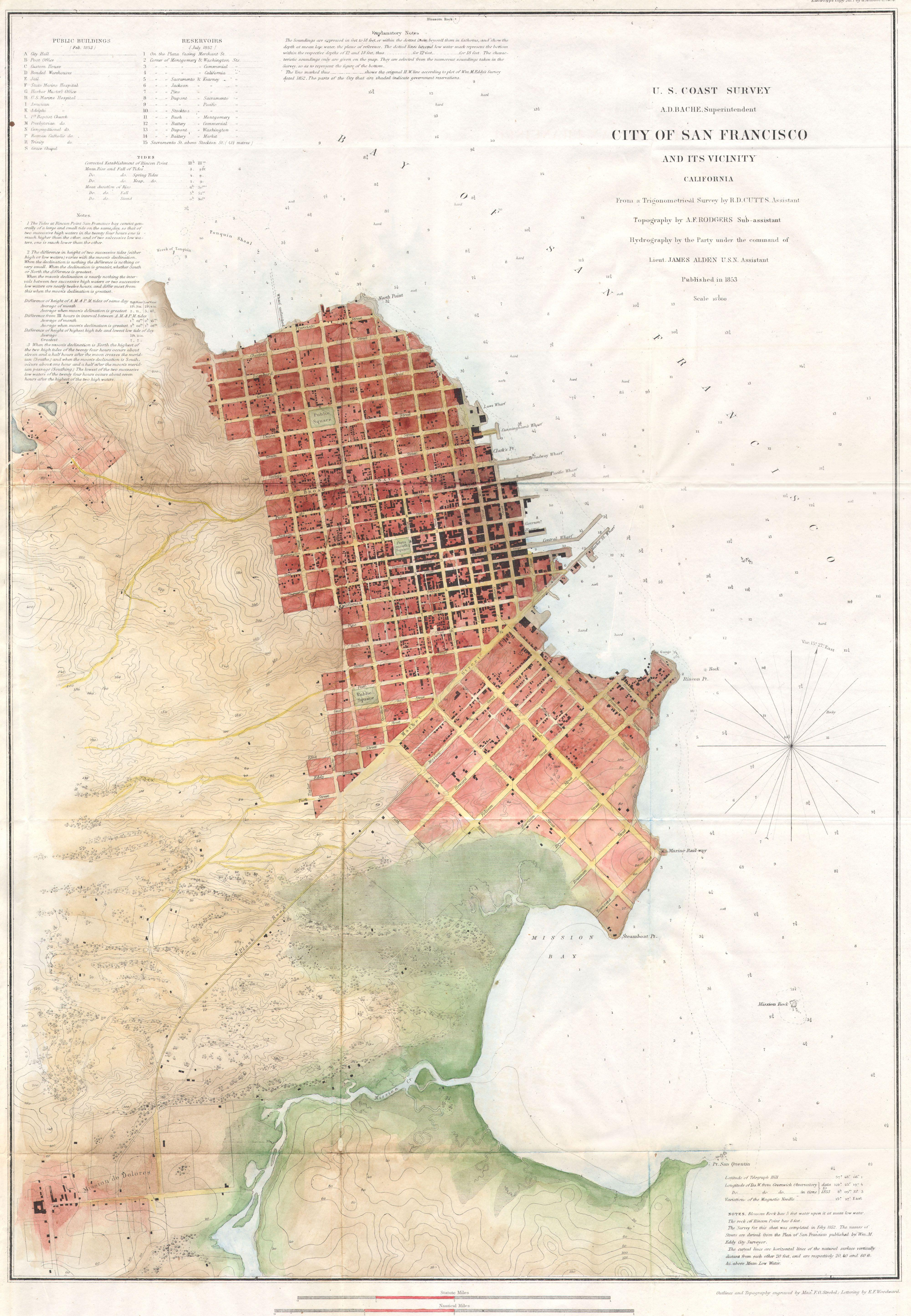
The Shoreline of San Francisco in 1853.

North Point is geographic feature and, formerly, a cape on the northeast side of San Francisco, California. Historically, the location of the cape was at the foot of Loma Alta (now Telegraph Hill), approximately at what is now the intersection of Bay and Kearny Streets, just southwest of Pier 35. That location has since been covered by land fill that extends to The Embarcadero. The United States Geological Survey now treats North Point as coinciding with the location of Pier 39.

In the early history of San Francisco, the original location of the Yerba Buena anchorage was near North Point, but later relocated southward to Yerba Buena Cove, south of Clarks Point.

The North Point Water Pollution Control Plant, a sewage treatment plant, currently sits on the historical location of North Point. North Point Street runs a block north of Bay Street. It is built on land fill, and the eastern terminus of the street is just north of where North Point was located.
