= Telegraph Hill, San Francisco =

Telegraph Hill
- Neighborhood
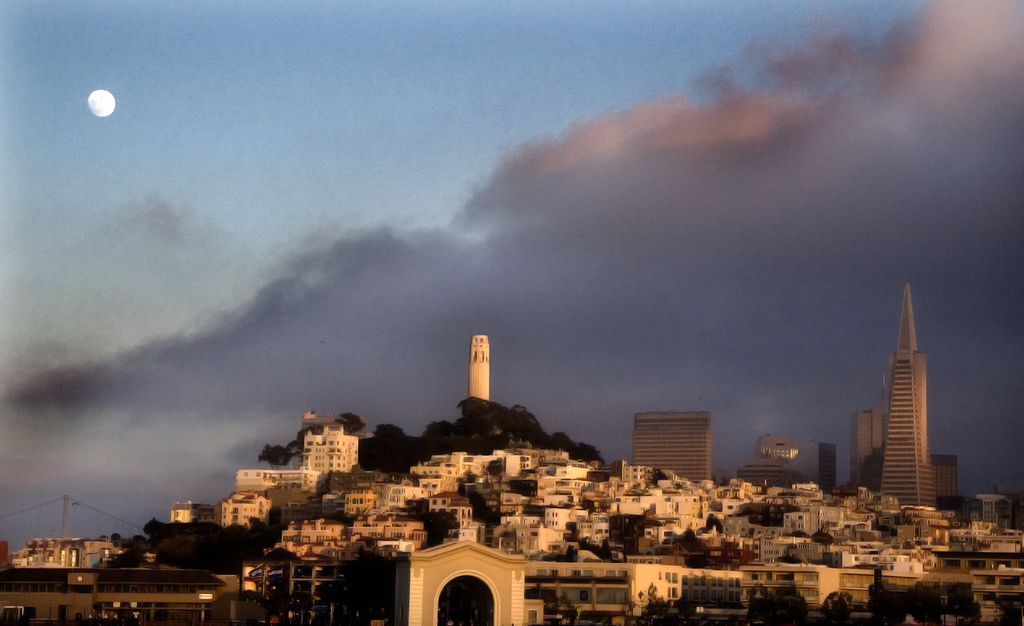
- Telegraph Hill from San Francisco Bay

- Location within Central San Francisco
- Coordinates: 37.802409°N 122.40587°W
- Country: United States
- State: California
- City-county: San Francisco

Government
  - Supervisor: Danny Sauter
  - State Assembly: Matt Haney (D)
  - State Senator: Scott Wiener (D)
  - U. S. Rep.: Nancy Pelosi (D)

Area
  - Total: 0.215 sq mi (0.56 km^{2})
  - Land: 0.215 sq mi (0.56 km^{2})

Population (2008)
  - Total: 8,177
  - Density: 38,055/sq mi (14,693/km^{2})
- ZIP Code: 94133, 94111
- Area codes: 415/628

California Historical Landmark
- Reference no.: 91

Telegraph Hill (elev. 285 ft (87 m)) is a hill and surrounding neighborhood in San Francisco, California. It is one of San Francisco's 44 hills, and one of its original "Seven Hills". The iconic Coit Tower stands at the apex of Telegraph Hill.

== Location ==
The organization Telegraph Hill Dwellers defines the neighborhood in its bylaws, as follows:

The defined area of Telegraph Hill shall be all that property situated within the following boundaries: Commencing at the SE corner of Bay and Powell Streets, thence southerly along Powell Street to Columbus Avenue, thence south-easterly along Columbus Avenue to Broadway, thence easterly along Broadway to the Embarcadero, thence northerly and westerly along the Embarcadero to Powell Street and southerly to the point of beginning.

This definition overlaps with other areas that are often defined as being part of San Francisco's North Beach neighborhood and Northern Waterfront district.

Another definition states that the neighborhood is bounded by Vallejo Street to the south, Sansome Street to the east, Francisco Street to the north and Powell Street and Columbus Avenue to the west, where the northwestern corner of Telegraph Hill overlaps with the North Beach neighborhood.

== History ==
Originally named Loma Alta ("High Hill") during the Spanish and Mexican eras of San Francisco history. Before the shoreline of San Francisco had been pushed eastward by landfill, the bottom of Loma Alta would have formed the shoreline of San Francisco Bay between North Point and Yerba Buena Cove. From 1825 through 1847, the area between Sansome and Battery, Broadway and Vallejo streets was used as a burial ground for foreign non-Catholic seamen. The hill was later familiarly known as Goat Hill by the early San Franciscans and became the neighborhood of choice for many Irish-American immigrants.

The hill owes its current name to a semaphore, a windmill-like structure erected in September 1849, for the purpose of signaling to the rest of the city the nature of the ships entering the Golden Gate. Atop the newly built house, the marine telegraph consisted of a pole with two raisable arms that could form various configurations, each corresponding to a specific meaning: steamer, sailing boat, etc. The information was used by observers operating for financiers, merchants, wholesalers and speculators. Knowing the nature of the cargo carried by the ship they could predict the upcoming (generally lower) local prices for those goods and commodities carried. Those who did not have advance information on the cargo might pay a too-high price from a merchant unloading his stock of a commodity—a price that was about to drop. On October 18, 1850, the ship Oregon signaled to the hill as it was entering the Golden Gate the news of California's recently acquired statehood.

The pole-and-arm signals on the Telegraph Hill semaphore became so well known to townspeople of San Francisco that, according to one story, during a play in a San Francisco theater, an actor held his arms aloft and cried, "Oh God, what does this mean?", prompting a rogue in the gallery to shout, "Sidewheel steamer!", which brought down the house.

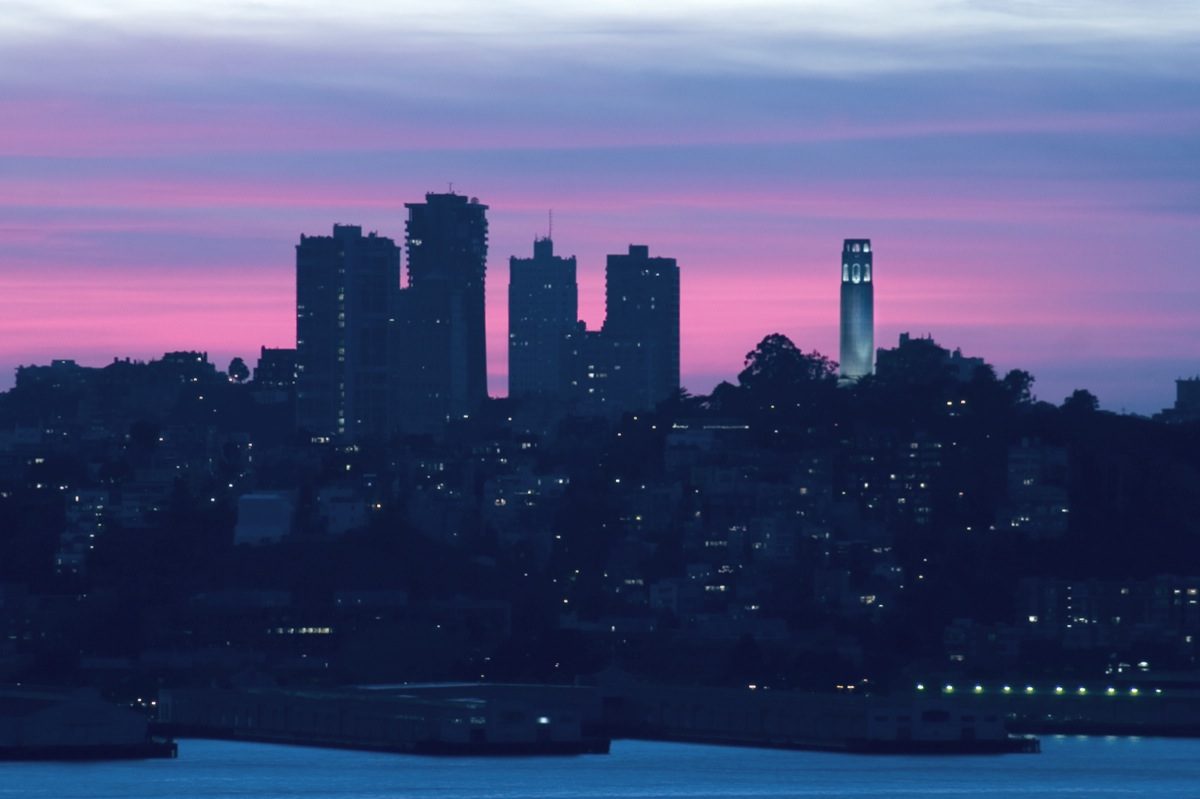
Telegraph Hill and the Coit Tower after sunset as seen from the East Bay

Sailing ships brought cargo to San Francisco but needed ballast when leaving. Rocks for ballast were quarried from the bay side of Telegraph Hill. Exposed rock from this quarrying is still visible from the Vallejo Steps and from Broadway, where there was a large landslide on February 27, 2007, that damaged property and forced the evacuation of many residents.

In September 1853, the first telegraph in California, which extended eight miles to Point Lobos, San Francisco, was set up on the hill and replaced the semaphore, therefore giving the hill the name of "Telegraph Hill." This telegraph was known as the Marine Telegraph Station, and was destroyed by a storm in 1870.

In 1876, the hilltop land of the original Marine Telegraph Station was purchased by George Hearst, who donated it to the city under the stipulation that the land be dubbed as the Pioneer Park. In 1932–1933, Coit Tower was built where the semaphore and telegraph once stood. Telegraph Hill retained its name and is now registered as California Historical Landmark #91, with a bronze plaque in the lobby of Coit Tower marking the location of the original signal station.

In the 1920s, Telegraph Hill became, along with adjacent North Beach, a destination for poets and bohemian intellectuals, dreaming of turning it into a West Coast West Village.

== Attractions and characteristics ==
Telegraph Hill is primarily a residential area, much quieter than adjoining North Beach with its bustling cafés and nightlife. Aside from Coit Tower, it is well known for its gardens flowing down the nearly 400 wooden steps of Filbert Street down to Levi's Plaza.

=== Coit Tower and Pioneer Park ===
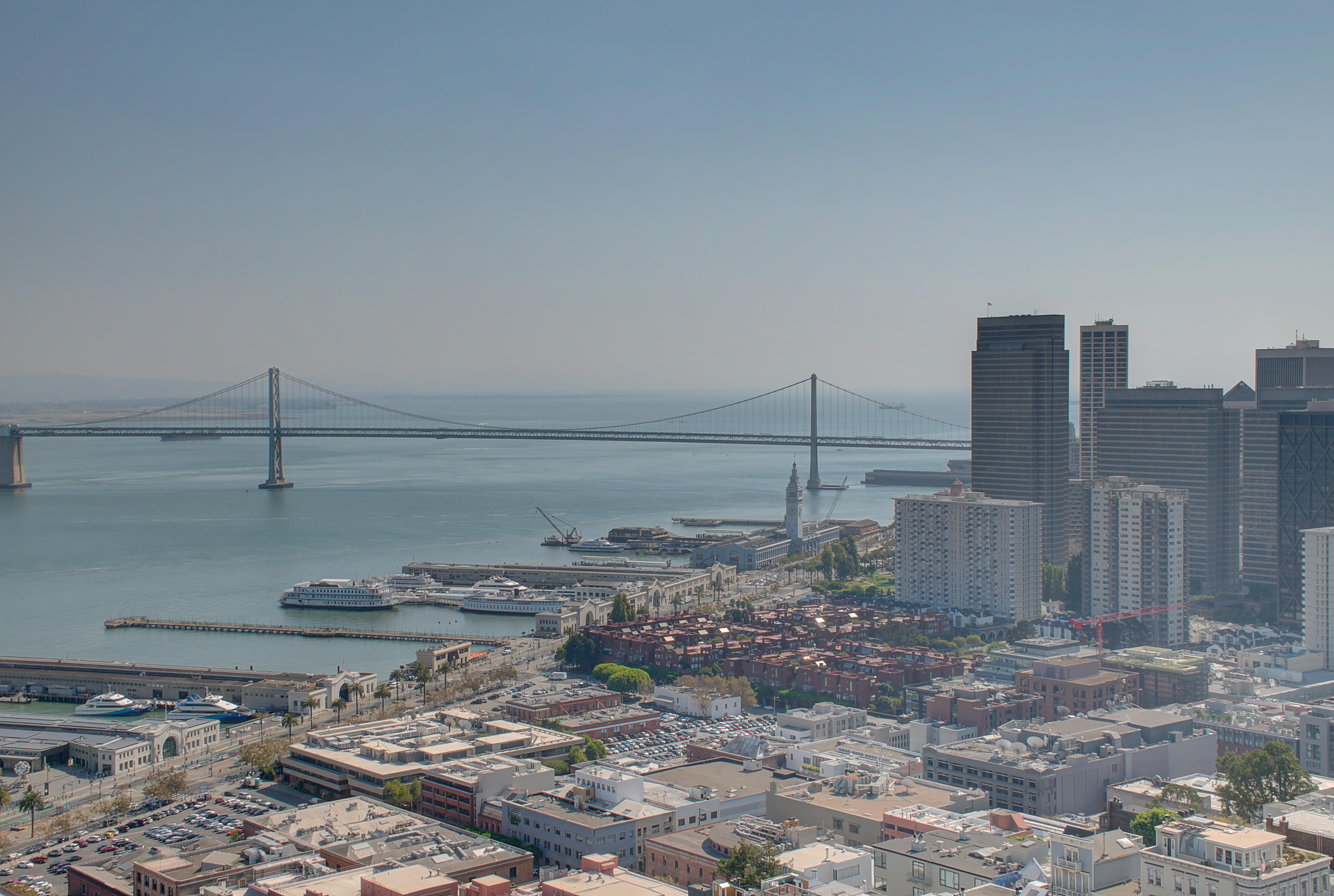
View from Coit Tower, looking southward, toward the San Francisco Ferry Building and the San Francisco–Oakland Bay Bridge.

The apex of Telegraph Hill is dominated by the 210-foot Art Deco structure, Coit Tower, a landmark visible through much of San Francisco and beyond and one of the city's iconic symbols. The tower was completed in 1933 and was funded from a bequest by Lillie Hitchcock Coit for the beautification of San Francisco. An urban legend holds that the tower is shaped like a firehose nozzle in tribute to Coit's early patronage of the San Francisco Fire Department, but any such resemblance is coincidental and was not the intention of the tower's designers. The interior of Coit Tower contains a series of murals in the American Social Realist style by over 20 different artists. Although these are often described as "WPA murals", they were commissioned by Public Works of Art Project, a predecessor of the Federal Art Project of the Works Progress Administration.

Coit Tower lies within Pioneer Park, which features broad views of the city from vantage points below the tower. Steps around the park feature names of individuals who donated to fund the restoration of Pioneer Park. Pioneer Park predates Coit Tower, and was established in 1876 in celebration of the United States Centennial. Pioneer Park also used to feature a bronze statue of Christopher Columbus placed there in 1957. It was removed in June 2020 based on objections to Columbus's historical legacy.

=== Step streets of Telegraph Hill ===
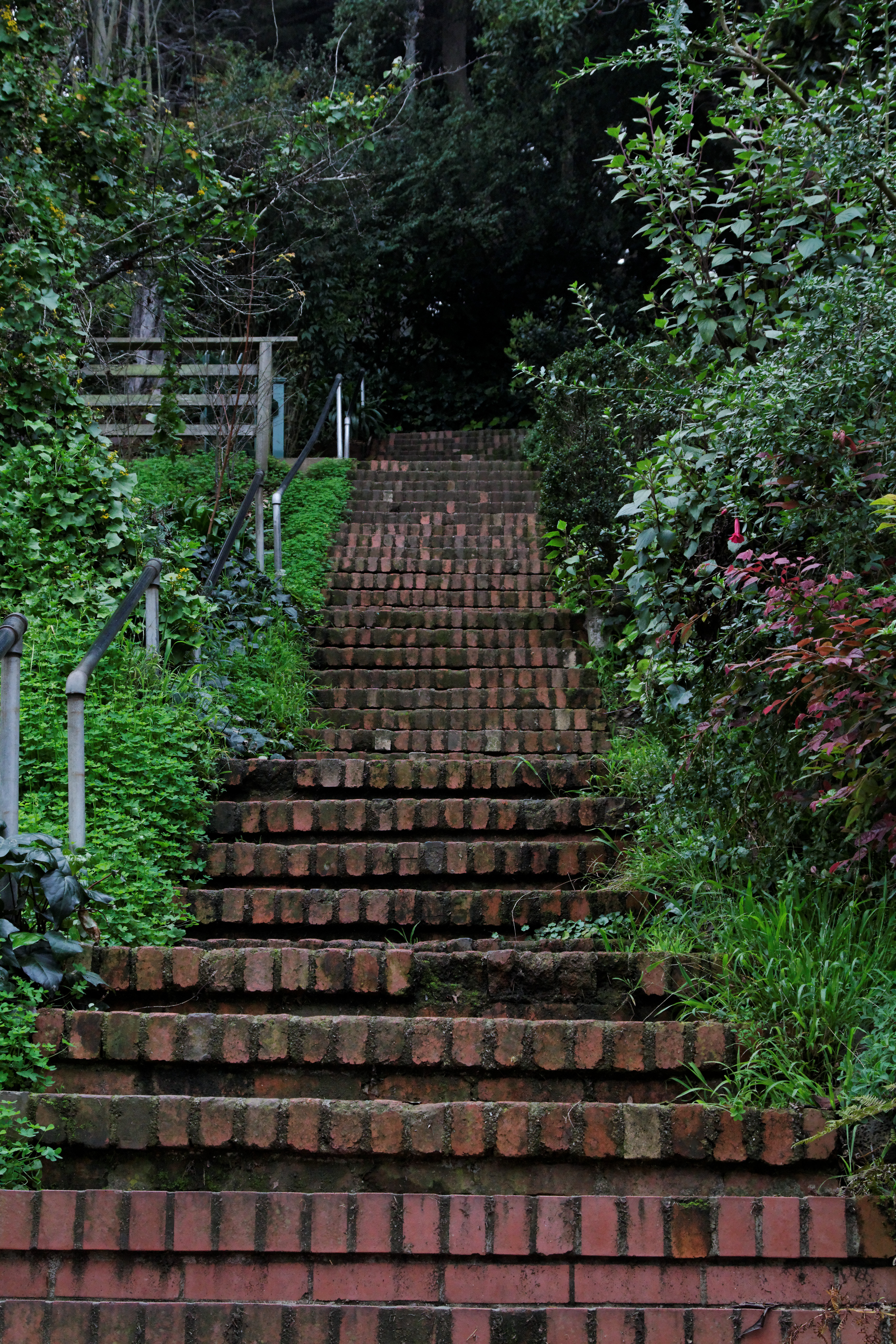
The Greenwich Steps.

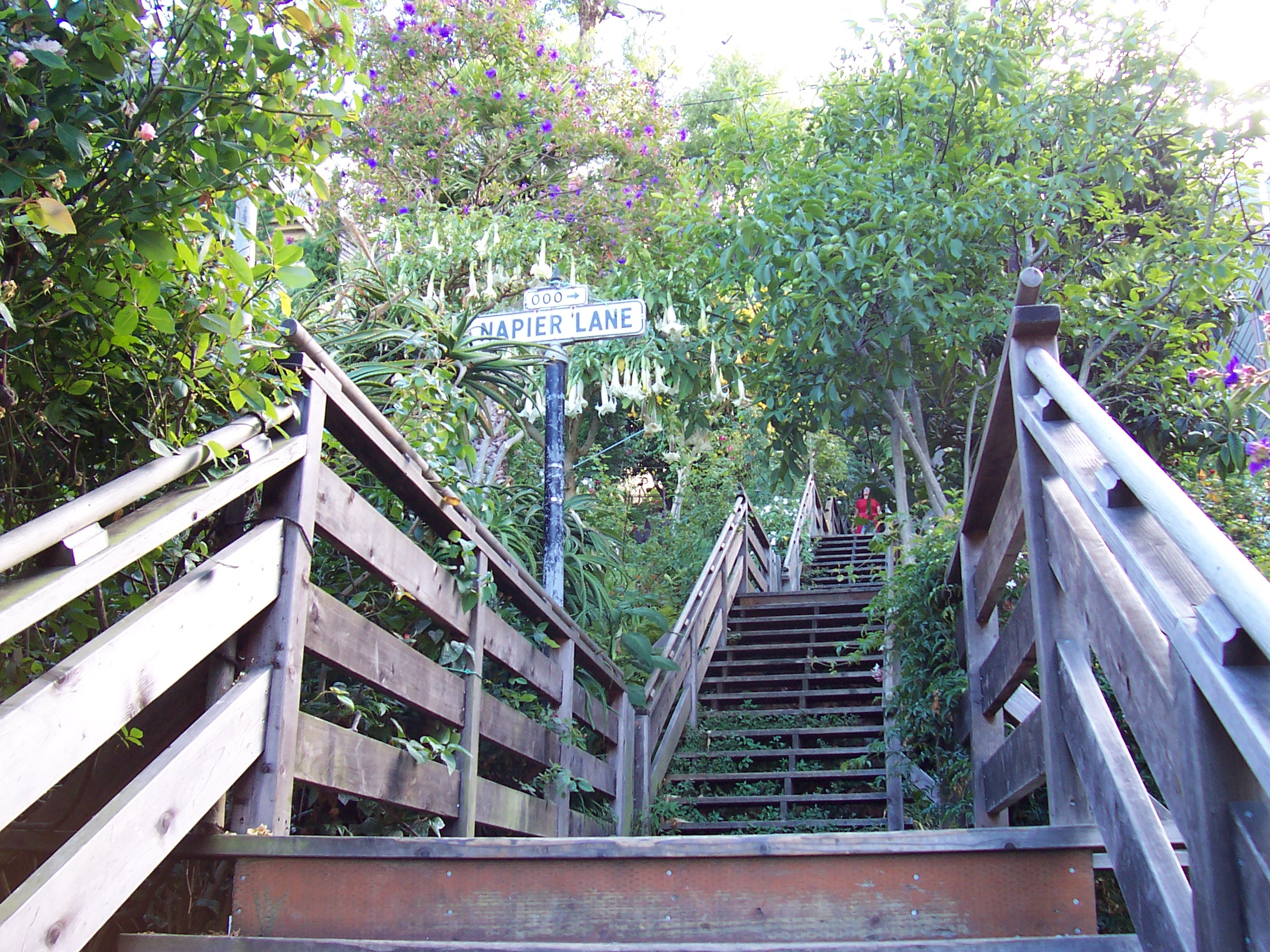
The Filbert Steps and Napier Lane.

Due to the steepness of some sections of Telegraph Hill in combination with the scarcity of land in San Francisco on which to develop property, the neighborhood contains several residential step streets, which can only be transversed on foot via relatively steep stairways. Perhaps the best known of these are the Filbert Steps and the nearby Greenwich Steps, which run down the east side of Telegraph Hill below Pioneer Park.

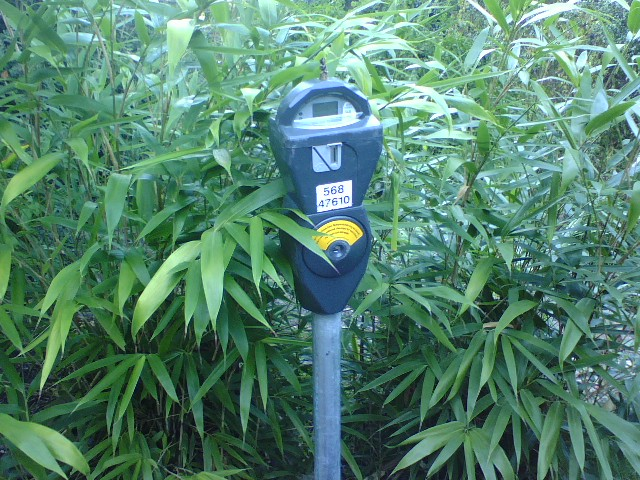
San Francisco parking meter 568-47610, Filbert Steps.

The Filbert Street Steps, consisting of about 400 wooden steps that descend the east slope of Telegraph Hill connect two segments of Filbert Street. The steps pass the gardens of houses on the hill, and run through the Grace Marchant Garden, which resident Grace Marchant started in 1949 and is now tended to and paid for by the residents of the "street." From there, the steps run down to an eastern stub of Filbert Street and the walkway through the plaza to The Embarcadero. Many houses in this residential neighborhood are accessible only from the steps. As on paved streets, several fire hydrants and a solitary parking meter are located along the steps.

Other step streets on Telegraph Hill are the Calhoun Steps that descend from a dead end of Union Street, and the Vallejo Steps that run for one block between two regular drivable sections of Vallejo Street.

=== Malloch Building and Julius' Castle ===
The northern end of Montgomery Street runs through Telegraph Hill, bisecting the Filbert and Greenwich Steps. Two landmark buildings are found here. At the corner where Montgomery bisects with the Filbert Steps is the Malloch Building, an apartment building built in 1937 in the Streamline Moderne style. It is best known for being the exterior location for the 1947 Humphrey Bogart and Lauren Bacall film noir Dark Passage. A block to the north, where Montgomery Street comes to a dead-end is Julius' Castle, a now-closed (as of 2025) restaurant housed in a historic castle-shaped building situated at the edge of a cliff and offering sweeping vistas of the city's waterfront area.

=== Telegraph Hill Neighborhood Center ===
In 1890, Elizabeth Ashe and Alice Griffith founded a settlement house that would become the Telegraph Hill Neighborhood Center to help fight illness, illiteracy and poor conditions in North Beach and lobbied hard for better recreation opportunities for neighborhood children. In 1907, the city formed its first playground commission with the idea of carving out space for recreation areas specifically for kids. The first playground commission picked two sites, including the North Beach Playground. The plan included an outdoor swimming pool, which was financed by diverting funds from a fire department cistern planned for Powell and Lombard, perhaps the first publicly financed public pool in the city. In 1910, the North Beach playground and pool was constructed. The three youngest of the nine DiMaggio kids, Vince, Joe and Dom, grew up playing baseball there in the 1920s and became professional baseball players.

== Wildlife ==
=== Parrots ===
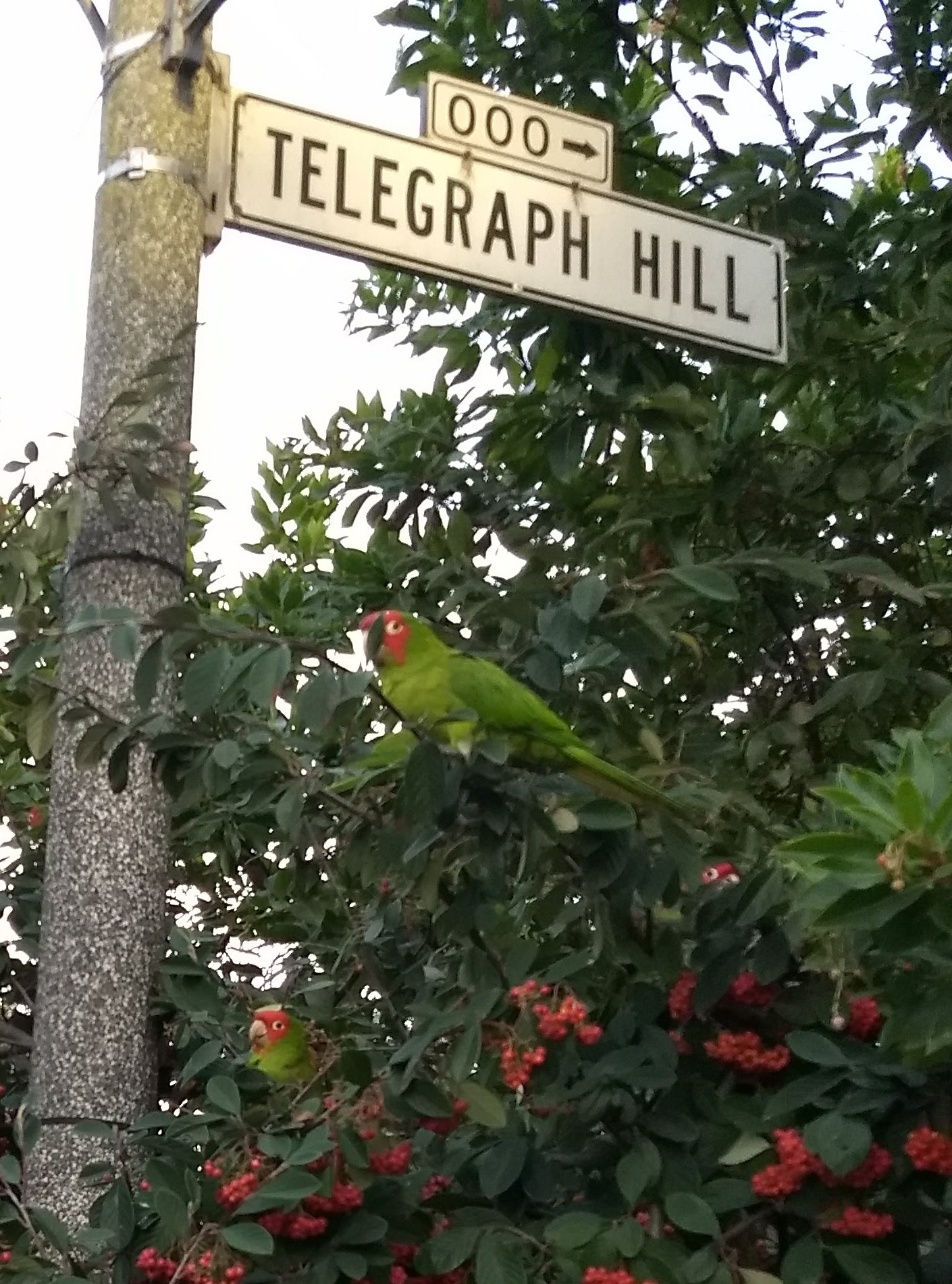
Feral parrots of Telegraph Hill

Telegraph Hill is known for supporting a flock of feral parrots, a mix of red-masked parakeets (Psittacara erythrogenys) and mitred parakeets (Psittacara mitratus), descended from escaped or released pets. The birds, known in the bird trade as cherry-headed conures, are native to Peru and Ecuador. They have established a breeding colony with the support of some residents, and through the help of volunteers with Mickaboo Companion Bird Rescue.

The flock was popularized by a book and subsequent documentary (2003), both titled The Wild Parrots of Telegraph Hill. The book and the subject of the documentary is Mark Bittner, the birds' caretaker for many years, who originally came to the Filbert Steps as caretaker for a house there during the 1990s and soon bonded with the flock of feral parakeets that were establishing themselves in the area.

According to Bittner, the term "The Wild Parrots of Telegraph Hill", while poetic, is a misnomer, and the flock ranges widely and is not centered on Telegraph Hill. Even in the area of San Francisco around Telegraph Hill, the place where the parakeets commonly nest and are most reliably seen is in Sue Bierman Park near the Ferry Building. Currently (as of 2024), feral parakeets are regularly seen in many of San Francisco's parks and into suburban areas as well.

A controversial San Francisco city ordinance that prohibits the feeding of parrots in public spaces passed on June 5, 2007. The feeding ban was championed by Mark Bittner, who had previously fed them for years. Other local conservationists also supported the ban, though some residents continue to object.

In 2023, the San Francisco Board of Supervisors passed a resolution designating the conures as San Francisco's Official Animal. The species was chosen by a poll on Twitter, and barely beat out the California sea lion, best known locally as an attraction at Pier 39.

=== Coyotes ===
Pioneer Park, atop Telegraph Hill, and the surrounding area has since 2005 become home to a population of urban coyotes. They are often spotted by residents and tourists alike and do not seem particularly shy of humans. They have received a mixed reception in the neighborhood, with some saying they like having the coyotes around and even naming one of the females "Callie the Coyote", but with other residents expressing apprehension, fearing the coyotes could attack pets (which has happened elsewhere in San Francisco) or even humans.

The local coyotes have shown that they can adapt to a living in a very small territory. A 2025 study by a team of wildlife biologists from UC Davis has shown that the Telegraph Hill population obtains over 50% of their diet from anthropogenic sources, such as residential and restaurant waste.

== See also ==
- 49-Mile Scenic Drive
- List of San Francisco, California Hills
- The House on Telegraph Hill (1951 film)
- The Sniper (1952 film)
