= Sharp Park Golf Course =

Golf course in California, United States

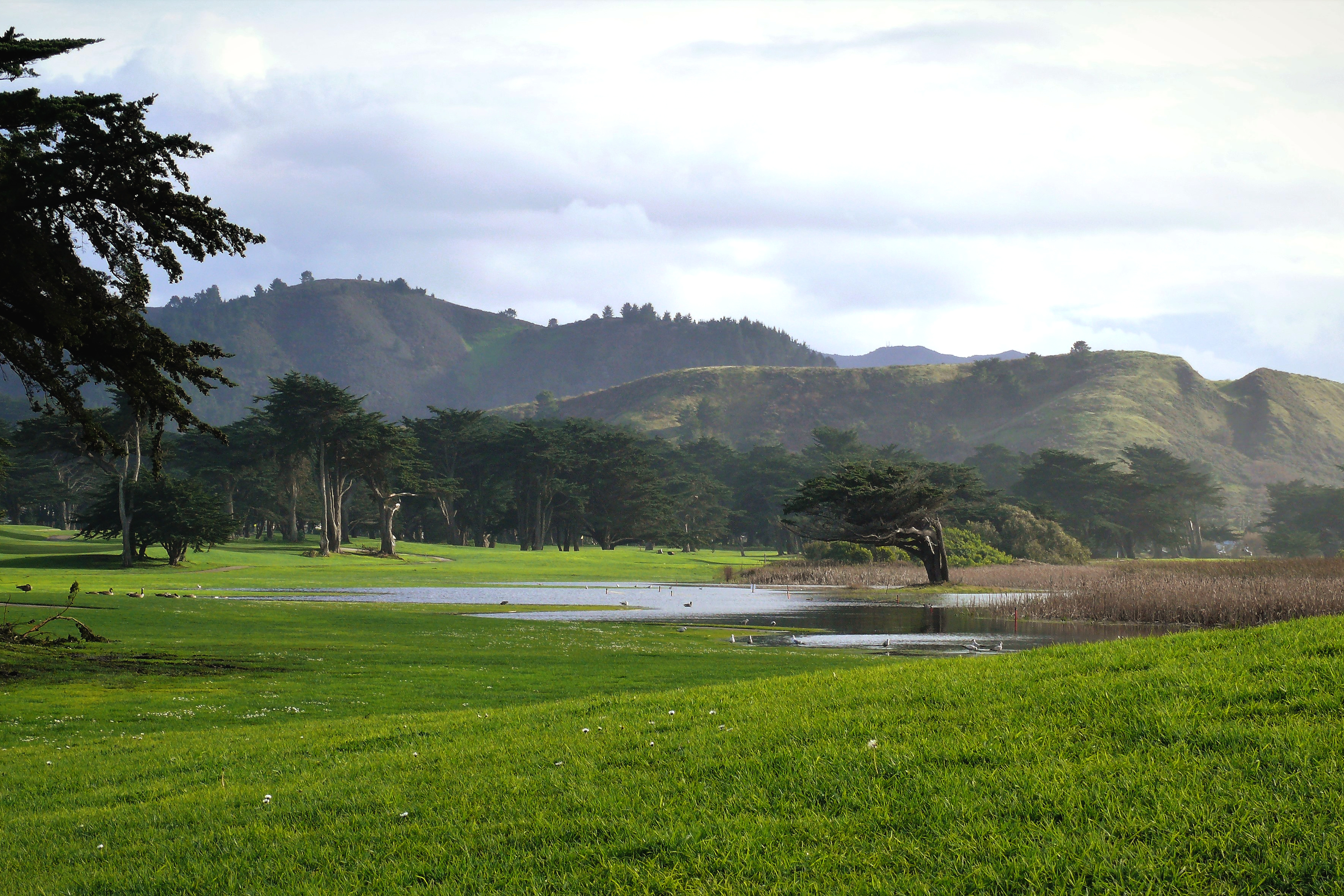
- Laguna Salada, Winter flooding, at Sharp Park Golf Course

- Location within the United States Location within California
- 37°37′32″N 122°29′10″W

Club information
- Location: Pacifica, California, United States
- Established: 1931; 95 years ago
- Type: Municipal
- Owner: Government of San Francisco
- Operator: San Francisco Recreation & Parks Department
- Total holes: 18
- Website: website
- Designed by: Dr. Alister Mackenzie
- Par: 72
- Length: 6,494-yard (5,938 m)
- Slope rating: 127

Sharp Park Golf Course is a public golf course in Pacifica in Northern California in the United States. Fourteen remaining holes were designed Dr. Mackenzie with four upland holes added by Jack Fleming after the loss of four oceanside holes. The course is owned and operated by the city of San Francisco. The only public oceanside golf course designed by MacKenzie in the United States is Sharp Park Golf Course in Pacifica, California.

U.S. Open champion Ken Venturi described the course as "Dr. MacKenzie's great gift to the American public course golfer."

== History ==
The park was originally owned by George Sharp a wealthy lawyer who came to San Francisco from New York in 1849. The coastal property bequeathed to the San Francisco Park commissioners Reuben Lloyd and Adolph Spreckels in 1917 by George Sharp's widow Honora Sharp. She stipulated it was to be used as a “public park or playground.” At the time of its donation, the site primarily consisted of wetlands, artichoke fields, and sand dunes. Through 1931, the property's ocean lagoon was deepened and converted into a fresh-water lake, and fairways and tees were sited on islands and spits.

In 1930, Golden Gate Park Superintendent John McLaren commissioned the Scottish course architect Alister MacKenzie to design San Francisco's third municipal golf links. The course was built on 120 acres and was designed by MacKenzie in-between designing his two most famous courses, Cypress Point Club and Augusta National. MacKenzie included several of his signature design tropes, including cross bunkering, double fairways, multiple tees, mounded greens, undulating fairways, and optical illusions. The course was opened to the public in 1932.

The Spanish Revival-style clubhouse was designed by an associate at Willis Polk's architecture firm and includes murals by the Works Progress Administration. The course debuted in 1932.

In the early 1940s, large storms washed out parts of MacKenzie's original routing, resulting in the construction of a seawall to protect the course. From 1942 until 1946, the area east of the golf course was used by the War Relocation Authority as a Japanese internment camp. In 2011, San Francisco mayor Ed Lee vetoed a measure for the National Park Service to take over operations at Sharp Park.

== Layout ==
Sharp Park's routes feature Monterey cypress, with views of the Pacific headlands and surrounding mountains. Twelve of the course holes retain their original routing. Changes have included an added seawall at holes 12 and 16, which are directly on the shore, as well as an additional four holes designed in 1934 which are accessible via a tunnel.

== Historic Status ==
In 2017, Sharp Park Golf Course was designated a Historic Resource Property under the California Environmental Quality Act. In a statement to NBC, architect Jay Blasi stated, "They are not making any more MacKenzies near the Pacific... This is a one-of-a-kind in the world of golf."

== Environmental concerns ==
The area around the course is home to two endangered species, the San Francisco garter snake and the California red-legged frog. As a result, the city of San Francisco faced multiple lawsuits by environmental organizations to protect the species, sparking what became known as the “Save Sharp Park” movement. In 2017, the San Francisco Board of Supervisors voted 9-to-1 to certify an environmental impact report to modify three holes to protect the species' habitats.

== See also ==
- Pebble Beach Golf Links
