= Lillie Hitchcock Coit =

American philanthropist (1843–1929)

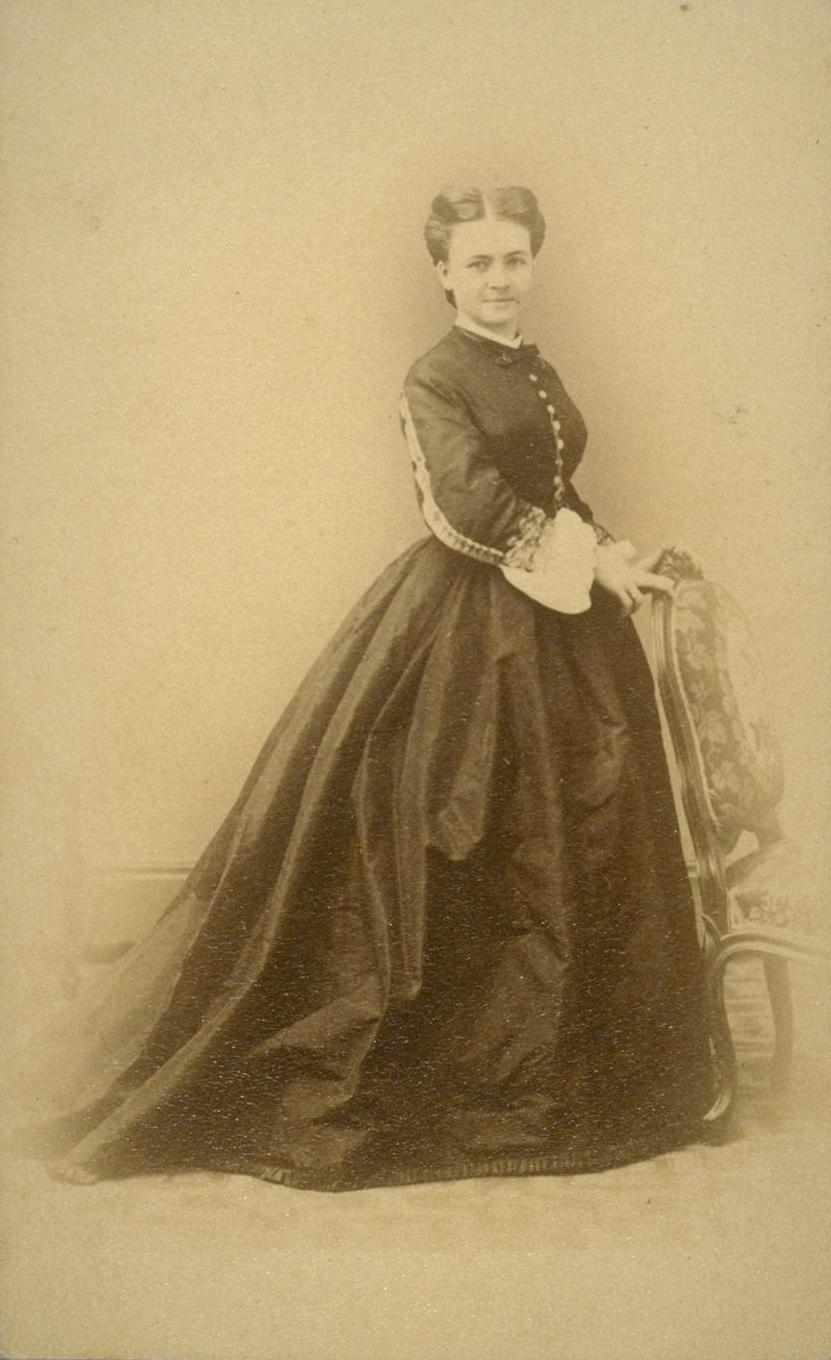
Lillie Hitchcock Coit, 1862

Elizabeth Hitchcock Coit (August 23, 1843 – July 22, 1929) was a patron of San Francisco's volunteer firefighters and the benefactor for the construction of the Coit Tower in San Francisco, California.

== Life ==
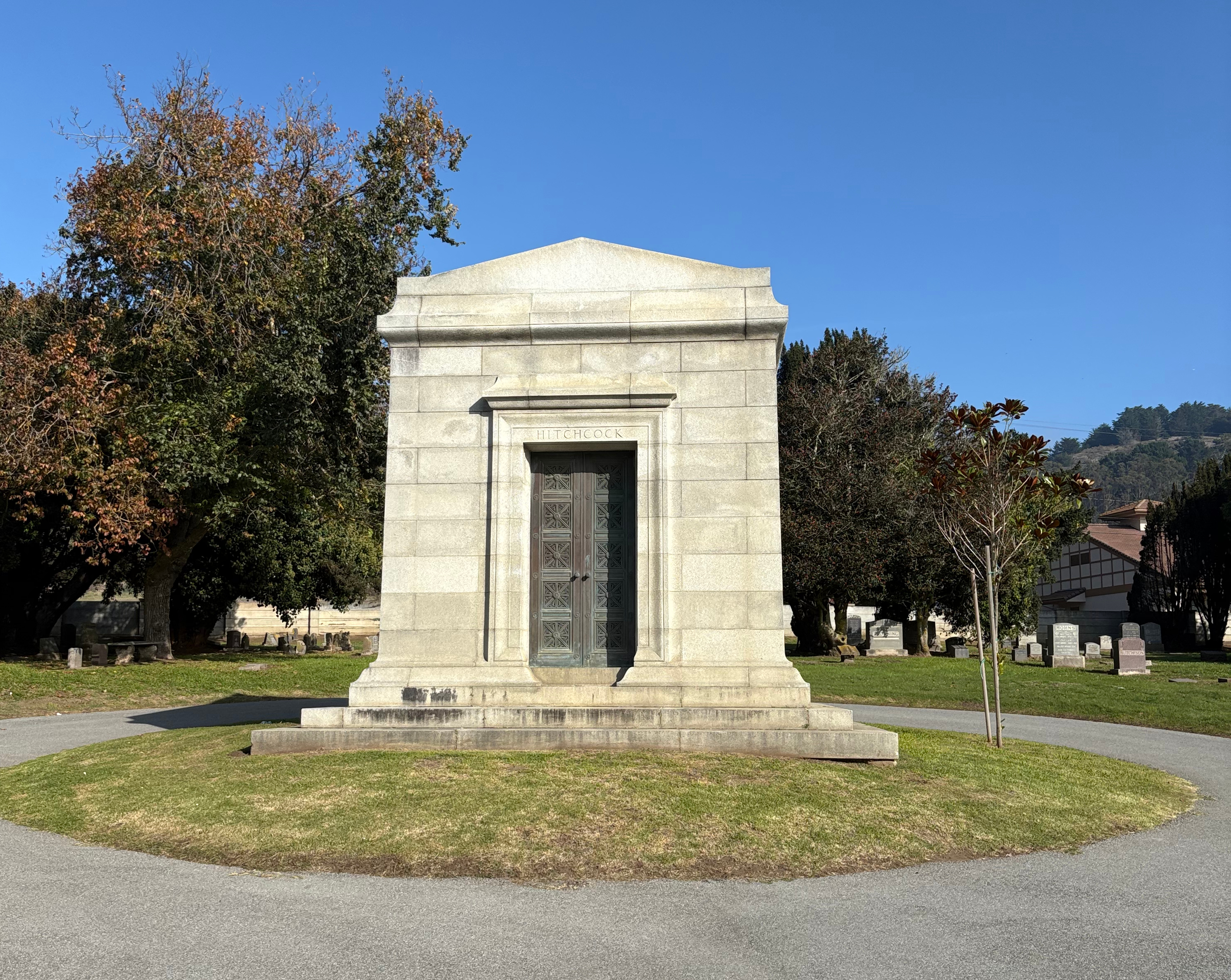
Hitchcock mausoleum at Cypress Lawn Memorial Park

Born in West Point, New York, in 1843, she moved to California from West Point with her parents—Charles, an Army doctor, and Martha Hitchcock.

"Firebelle Lil" Coit was considered eccentric, smoking cigars and wearing trousers long before it was socially acceptable for women to do so. She was an avid gambler and often dressed like a man in order to gamble in the male-only establishments that dotted North Beach.

Her father was successful and when he died he left a substantial inheritance. As a young woman, she traveled to Europe with her mother. After her return, she married Howard Coit, the "caller" of the San Francisco Stock Exchange during an economic boom. They separated in 1880, and he died in 1885 at age 47.

In 1903, Alexander Garrett, a distant cousin of Mrs. Coit, arrived at her Palace Hotel apartment armed with a gun to settle a business dispute. A friend of Mrs. Coit's, Major McClung, who was present in order to deliver a message to her was shot and killed while reportedly protecting Coit. Toward the end of her life, Coit had a long stay in Europe but returned to San Francisco where she died in 1929. She was buried at Cypress Lawn Memorial Park in Colma.

== Firefighting ==
Coit was fascinated by firefighters from a young age. At age 15, in 1858, she reportedly witnessed the Knickerbocker Engine Co. No. 5 respond to a fire call on Telegraph Hill when they were shorthanded, and helped them get up the hill ahead of other competing engine companies. Sources differ on whether this happened while she was coming home from school or coming from a rehearsal for a wedding. She was thereafter treated as a "mascot" of the firefighters, and after her return from travel in Europe, in October 1863, she was made an honorary member of the engine company. She then rode along with the firefighters when they went to a fire or were in parades, and attended their annual banquets. When volunteer firefighters were ill, she visited the sickbed, and when they died, Coit sent flowers and attended the funerals. She continued this relationship with firefighting throughout her life, and after her death her ashes were placed into a mausoleum with a variety of firefighting-related memorials.

== Bequest ==
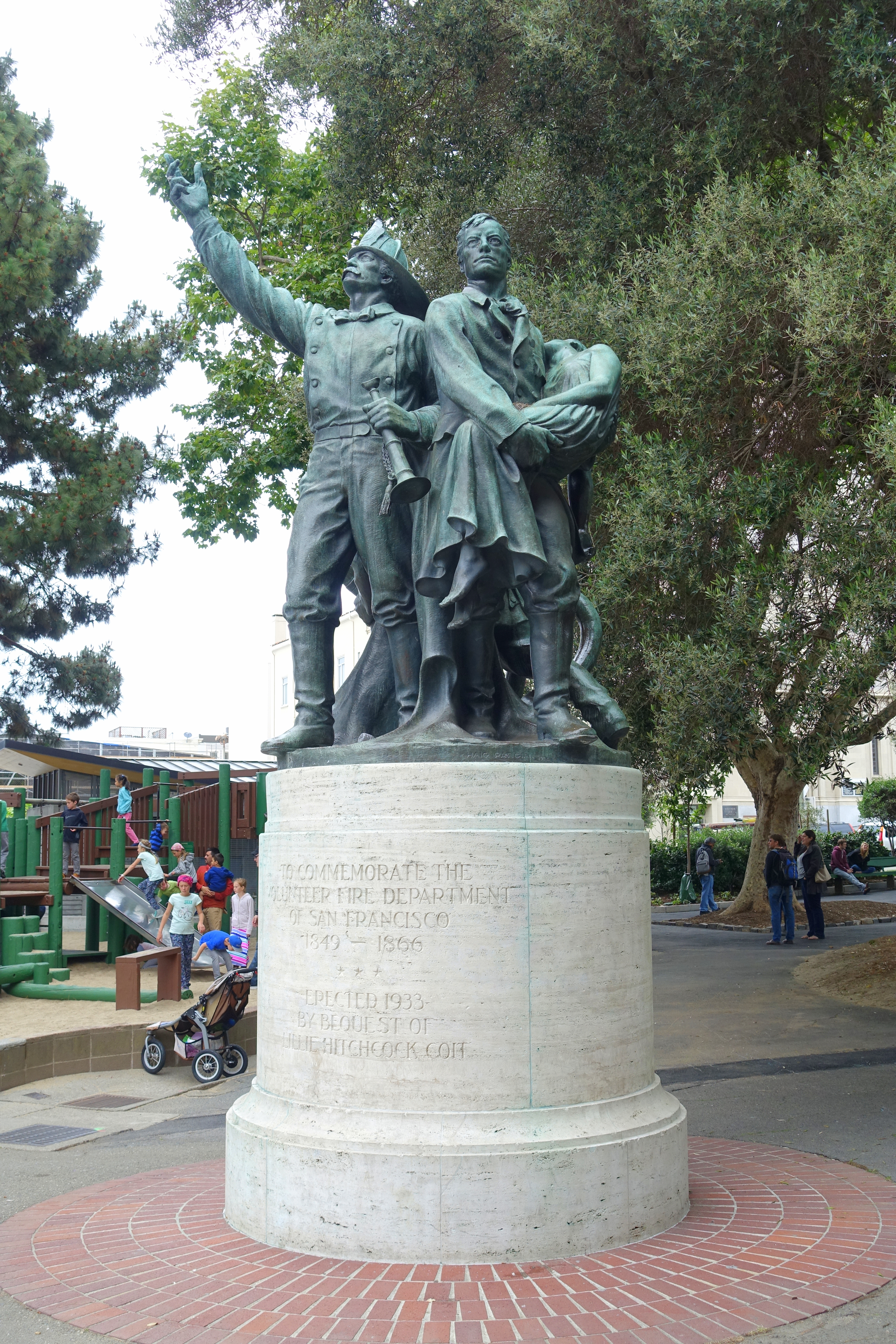
Statue of three volunteer firefighters, funded by Coit's bequest

Coit left one-third of her estate to the City of San Francisco "to be expended in an appropriate manner for the purpose of adding to the beauty of the city which I have always loved". The city used this bequest to build Coit Tower on Telegraph Hill.

The remainder of her bequest also sponsored another neighborhood landmark, a statue of three firefighters at the northwest corner of Washington Square Park.

== Legacy ==
Coit's nickname "Firebelle Lil" inspired the name of the Women's Pro Baseball League team the San Francisco Firebells.
