= List of statues of Thomas Jefferson =

A list of statues of Thomas Jefferson, a Founding Father, the principal author of the United States Declaration of Independence, an influential intellectual force in the Enlightenment, and the nation's third president:

Image	Statue name	Location	Date	Sculptor	Source
	Bust of Thomas Jefferson	Washington, D.C. United States Senate chamber	1888	Moses Jacob Ezekiel	
	Jefferson Memorial Statue	Washington, D.C. West Potomac Park	1939–1943	Rudulph Evans	
	Jefferson Monument	Louisville, Kentucky; Louisville Metro Hall	1899	Moses Jacob Ezekiel	
	Statue of Thomas Jefferson	New York City, New York; Columbia University	1914	William Ordway Partridge	
	Statue of Thomas Jefferson	Washington, D.C. United States Capitol New York City, New York; New York City Hall	1834	David d'Angers	
	Statue of Thomas Jefferson	Charlottesville, Virginia; University of Virginia	1910	Moses Jacob Ezekiel	
	Thomas Jefferson	Charlottesville, Virginia; University of Virginia	1915	Karl Bitter	
	Thomas Jefferson	Cleveland, Ohio; Cuyahoga County Courthouse	1911	Karl Bitter	
	Thomas Jefferson	Portland, Oregon; Jefferson High School	1916	Karl Bitter	
	Thomas Jefferson (Bitter)	St. Louis, Missouri; Missouri History Museum	1913	Karl Bitter	
	Virginia Washington Monument	Richmond, Virginia; Capitol Square	1850–1869	Thomas Crawford and Randolph Rogers	
	Thomas Jefferson	Paris, France 7th arrondissement	2006	Jean Cardot	

== See also ==
- List of paintings of Thomas Jefferson
- List of sculptures of presidents of the United States
- Mount Rushmore
- Statue of Thomas Jefferson (Decatur, Georgia)
- Statue of Thomas Jefferson (Hempstead, New York)
- Presidential memorials in the United States
