= Hofstra University Museum =

Hofstra University Museum of Art
- A view of the Emily Lowe Gallery from the parking lot.

- Location of Hofstra University Museum in New York State
- Established: 1963
- Location: Hempstead, New York
- Coordinates: 40°42′52″N 73°36′3″W
- Type: Art museum
- Owner: Hofstra University
- Website: http://www.hofstra.edu/Community/museum/index.html

Hofstra University Museum is the art museum of Hofstra University, located in Hempstead, New York, in Long Island.

The museum has one gallery on campus: the Emily Lowe Gallery. The museum and the Emily Lowe Gallery were established in 1963 and have been a presence at the university for more than 50 years. The Hofstra University Museum is accredited by the American Alliance of Museums.

The Hofstra University Museum holds a collection of more than 5,200 art and ethnographic objects dating from 1,500 BCE to the contemporary period and representing six continents. The collections have grown primarily through gifts since the founding of Hofstra University in 1935, prior to the establishment of the museum, and there have been many local contributors to the museum's collections. The museum is noteworthy for African art and objects; Asian art is another area of strength with works dating from the seventh to the twentieth centuries.

The Hofstra University Museum owns an early Gauguin oil painting, Portrait of a Woman (1881–82), a statue of Thomas Jefferson, works by George Grosz, Conrad Felixmüller, Johan Barthold Jongkind, John Thomas Peele, Georges Rouault, Joseph Stella, Jane Peterson, and Alfred Maurer. Photographs in the collection include works of Berenice Abbott, Lucien Clergue, Danny Lyon, August Sander, Andy Warhol, and Edward Weston.
