= Statue of Thomas Jefferson (David d'Angers) =

1834 statue in the US Capitol rotunda

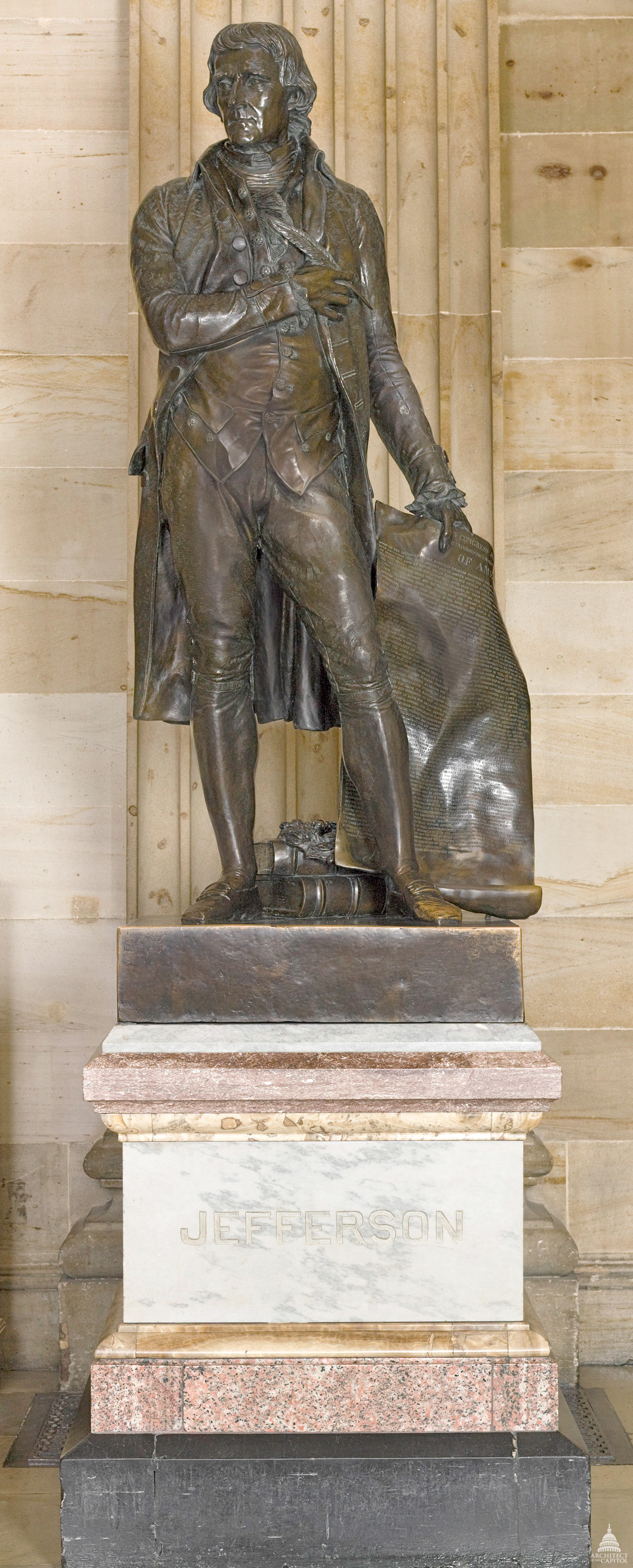
- Statue of Thomas Jefferson in the United States Capitol
- Artist: David d'Angers
- Subject: Thomas Jefferson
- Location: Washington, D.C., U.S.

A statue of American Founding Father and U.S. President Thomas Jefferson by the French sculptor David d'Angers stands in the Capitol rotunda of the United States Congress in Washington, D.C. Jefferson is portrayed holding a copy of the Declaration of Independence, which he drafted in June 1776 in Philadelphia as a member of the Committee of Five during the Second Continental Congress. The painted plaster model also stood in the chambers of the New York City Council.

== History ==
It was commissioned in 1832 by Jewish naval officer and New York real estate investor Uriah Phillips Levy, who was interested in Thomas Jefferson and eventually purchased his home of Monticello in 1836 with the goal of preserving it. Uriah told a friend that he had the statue made in tribute of Jefferson's stance on religious liberty, which he credited for his ability to succeed in the United States government as a Jewish man.

Levy visited the Paris studio of accomplished sculptor and École des Beaux Arts professor Pierre-Jean David d’Angers in 1832 and contracted the statue. Marquis de Lafayette provided his portrait of Thomas Jefferson by Thomas Sully for a reference. The statue was completed in clay in 1834 and was cast in bronze by Honoré Gonon and Sons. A story said that when the statue was finished, Lafayette embraced it, saying "Mon ami, mon ami" ("My friend, my friend").

The statue shows Jefferson with a pen in one hand and a copy of the United States Declaration of Independence in the other. There are also two books and a laurel wreath between his feet. On February 6, 1834, Levy gave the painted plaster model of the statue to the City of New York.

In March 1834, Levy offered the bronze statue to the Congress, and it was accepted in a letter by Senator Asher Robbins of Rhode Island, who was Chairman of the Joint Committee on the Library. The Senate agreed to accept the statue, but in debate some House members questioned it for a variety of reasons, including if it was proper to have a statue of Jefferson before they installed one of George Washington.

== Movement ==
While the work was initially placed in the Capitol rotunda, it was removed at an uncertain time, possibly in order to be replaced by the statue of George Washington by Horatio Greenough. In 1847, under authorization of President James K. Polk, it was moved to a pedestal on the north White House lawn. In 1873, during the presidency of Ulysses S. Grant, it was replaced in the North Lawn by a fountain and was moved to the East Entrance of the White House.

In 1874, Uriah Levy's brother lobbied Congress to have the statue returned to the Capitol. Damaged by its long exposure outside, it was cleaned and repaired. It was first placed in the National Statuary Hall, yet it was finally returned to the Rotunda in 1900, where it still remains.

== New York City version ==
In 1834, when the Common Council accepted Levy's gift, they also gave him a gold snuff box and the Freedom of the City. Before the statue was officially installed, it was displayed at 355 Broadway, with admission charged for viewing. According to press reports, the proceeds let Levy purchase and distribute 1,200 loaves of bread to be given to the poor.

For around seven decades, the statue was said to sit in the Governor's Room of City Hall. At some point, however, it was placed in a hall of the building's basement. After lobbying by Jefferson Monroe Levy, the Art Commission voted on July 1, 1919, to return the statue to the Governor's Room.

In 1995, as Deputy Mayor John S. Dyson was planning to restore City Hall, art scholar Leslie Freudenheim advocated it be moved from the side of the council chambers, where it had been placed at some point, to a more prominent location "at the juncture of City Hall's two magnificent, curvilinear staircases."

In 2011, when the Council returned after a year and a half of renovations, councilmember Letitia James noted that the statue had been cleaned.

=== New York City Council removal ===
Calling Jefferson "America's most noted slaveholder," on June 18, 2020, councilmembers Corey Johnson, Deborah Rose, Inez Barron, Adrienne Adams, Daneek Miller wrote a letter to Mayor Bill de Blasio asking him to support the statue's removal. On June 19, 2020, the Mayor stated that the review of this statue would be an issue explored by a "Commission on Racial Justice and Reconciliation" headed by First Lady Chirlane McCray.

The New York City Public Design Commission voted unanimously to remove the statue in October 2021. The statue was removed in November 2021.

== See also ==
- List of sculptures of presidents of the United States
- List of statues of Thomas Jefferson
