= Statue of Thomas Jefferson (Hempstead, New York) =

Sculpture in Hempstead, New York, U.S.

Thomas Jefferson
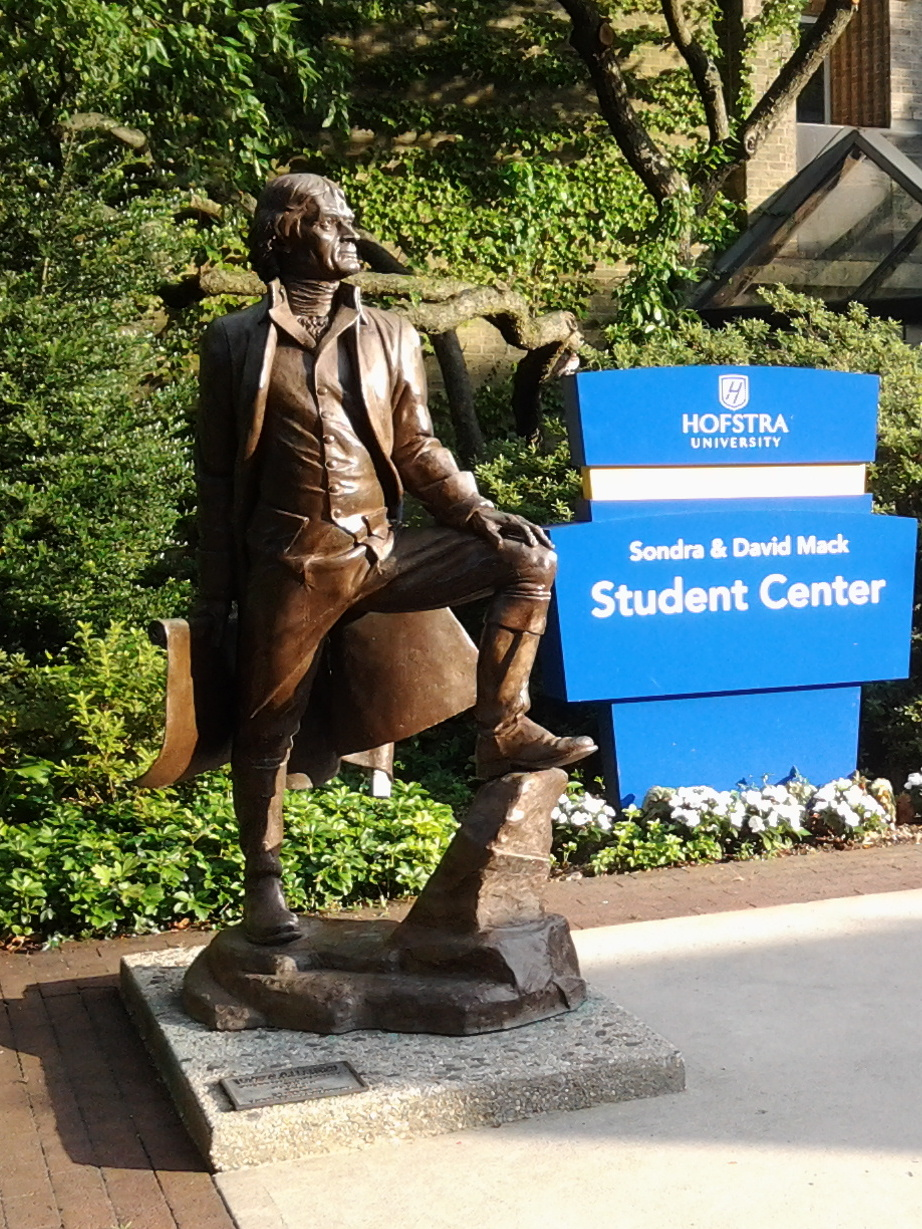
- The statue outside the Student Center in 2013
- Subject: Thomas Jefferson
- Location: Hempstead, New York, U.S.

Thomas Jefferson is a statue located at Hofstra University, in Hempstead, New York, United States.

== Description ==
A statue of Founding Father and United States President Thomas Jefferson is installed at Hofstra University. Jefferson is depicted holding the United States Declaration of Independence, a document he wrote in 1776, in his right hand.

The memorial was relocated in June 2020 to the Hofstra University Museum.

== See also ==
- List of statues of Thomas Jefferson
- List of monuments and memorials removed during the George Floyd protests
