= Statue of Thomas Jefferson (Columbia University) =

Statue in New York City

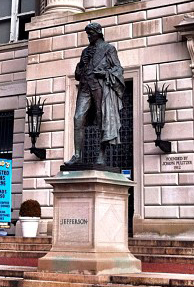
- The statue in front of Pulitzer Hall in 2012
- Artist: William Ordway Partridge
- Year: 1914
- Type: Sculpture
- Medium: Bronze
- Subject: Thomas Jefferson
- Location: New York City, New York, United States; 40.80747°N 73.96358°W

An outdoor sculpture of Thomas Jefferson by William Ordway Partridge is installed outside the School of Journalism on the Columbia University campus in Manhattan, New York, United States. It was modeled in plaster in 1901 and cast in bronze in 1914 by the New York–based foundry Roman Bronze Works.

== See also ==
- 1914 in art
- List of places named for Thomas Jefferson
- List of statues of Thomas Jefferson
- List of sculptures of presidents of the United States
