= Thomas Jefferson (Bitter) =

Statue by Karl Bitter

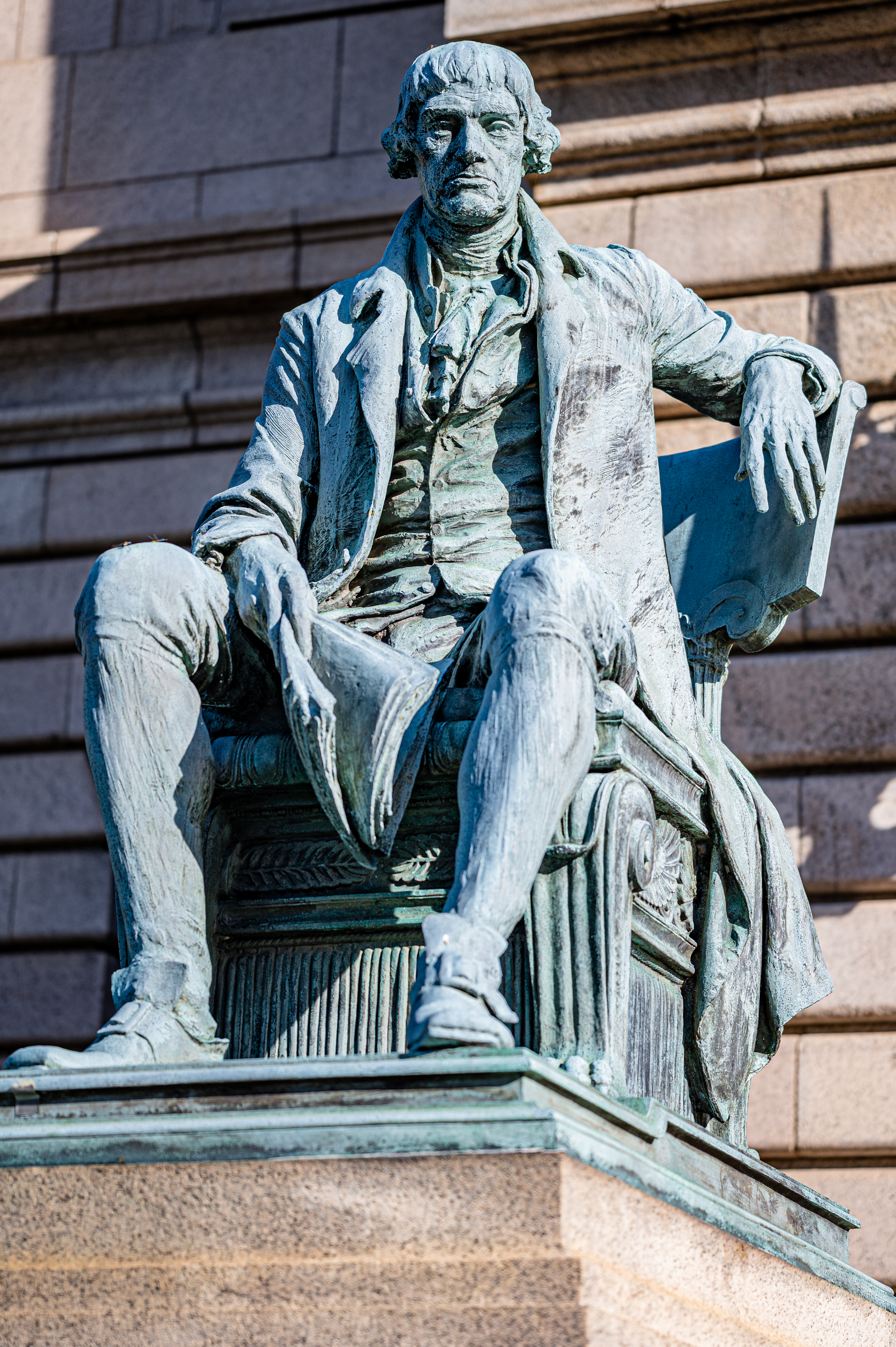
- The statue at the Cuyahoga County Courthouse in Cleveland
- Artist: Karl Bitter
- Subject: Thomas Jefferson
- Location: Original: Cleveland Replicas: Charlottesville, Virginia; New York City; Portland, Oregon, St. Louis; 41°30′11″N 81°41′49″W

The original statue is installed in at the Cuyahoga County Courthouse in Cleveland; replicas are installed at the University of Virginia in Charlottesville, Thomas Jefferson High School in Brooklyn, New York City, Jefferson High School in Portland, Oregon, and the Missouri History Museum in St. Louis.

Thomas Jefferson is a 1911 bronze statue of a seated Thomas Jefferson created by Karl Bitter for the Cuyahoga County Courthouse in Cleveland, Ohio, United States.

A 1913 marble version, approximately 50 percent larger than the Cleveland statue, is installed at the Missouri History Museum in St. Louis. Bronze replicas of the Cleveland statue were installed at the University of Virginia in Charlottesville in 1915, and at Jefferson High School in Portland, Oregon in 1916. A plaster replica was donated to Thomas Jefferson High School in Brooklyn, New York City in 1929.

== Cuyahoga County Courthouse, Cleveland ==
In 1909, Bitter was commissioned to create a bronze statue of a seated Thomas Jefferson and a bronze statue of a seated Alexander Hamilton, to flank the entrance steps to the Cuyahoga County Courthouse in Cleveland, Ohio. Both works were cast by the Roman Bronze Works, and installed in 1911. The Jefferson is approximately 72 in (180 cm) in height.

Jefferson is depicted wearing 18th-century clothes, sitting in a klismos chair and holding "papers of state in hand." According to Ferdinand Schevill, "It is a youthful and rebellious Jefferson, author of the Declaration of Independence who appears before us in Cleveland." James Dennis describes the statue as having a "generally rustic appearance" in contrast to the nearby Hamilton whom he sees as an "aggressive young aristocrat."

Bitter also created two marble attic figures for the courthouse, John Somers and Lord Mansfield.

== Replicas ==
=== Missouri History Museum, St. Louis ===
Bitter served as director of sculpture for the Louisiana Purchase Exposition, the 1904 World's Fair held in St. Louis to celebrate the centenary of the Louisiana Purchase. John Quincy Adams Ward was commissioned to create a heroic-size seated figure of Thomas Jefferson for the Exposition, but the commission went to Charles Grafly following Ward's withdrawal. Grafly's Seated Jefferson was modeled in staff, a temporary building material, and does not survive.

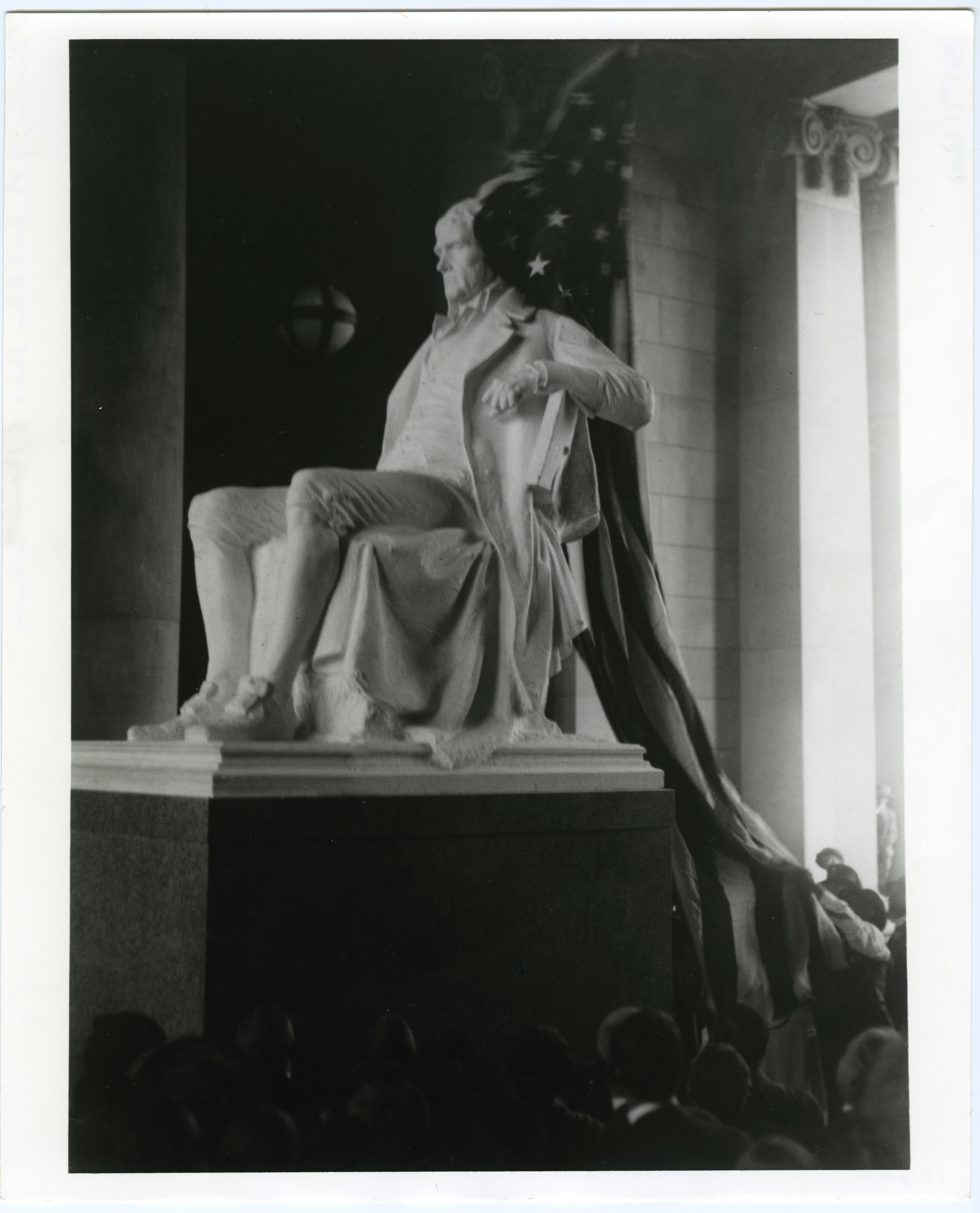
Unveiling of the marble statue at the Jefferson Memorial Building, 1913

In 1909, the Exposition's executive committee realized that the World's Fair had actually generated a profit. Instead of attempting to divide the profit among the Exposition's 15,000 stockholders, the committee decided to build a Jefferson Memorial in St. Louis. President Jefferson had played the central role in the 1803 Louisiana Purchase, and there was not yet a national monument to him in Washington, D.C. Architects were hired and, after the usual issues surrounding attempting to design by committee were resolved, Isaac S. Taylor designed the Jefferson Memorial Building.

The centerpiece of the memorial was to be a monumental statue of Jefferson. Bitter had already modeled his seated Jefferson for Cleveland, and the committee commissioned him to create a marble version 50 percent larger than the original. The Cleveland statue depicted a 33-year-old Jefferson, his age at the time of the writing of the Declaration of Independence. The St. Louis statue was to depict a 60-year-old President of the United States, his age at the time of the Louisiana Purchase. The statue was roughed out of a forty-five ton block of white marble in Italy, and shipped to St. Louis, where Bitter did the finished carving in situ. The completed statue was unveiled on April 13, 1913, Jefferson's 170th birthday.

The St. Louis Jefferson is 114 in (290 cm) in height, and stands upon a 90 in (230 cm) base. Bitter's one-quarter-size plaster model is in the collection of the St. Louis Art Museum.

=== University of Virginia, Charlottesville ===
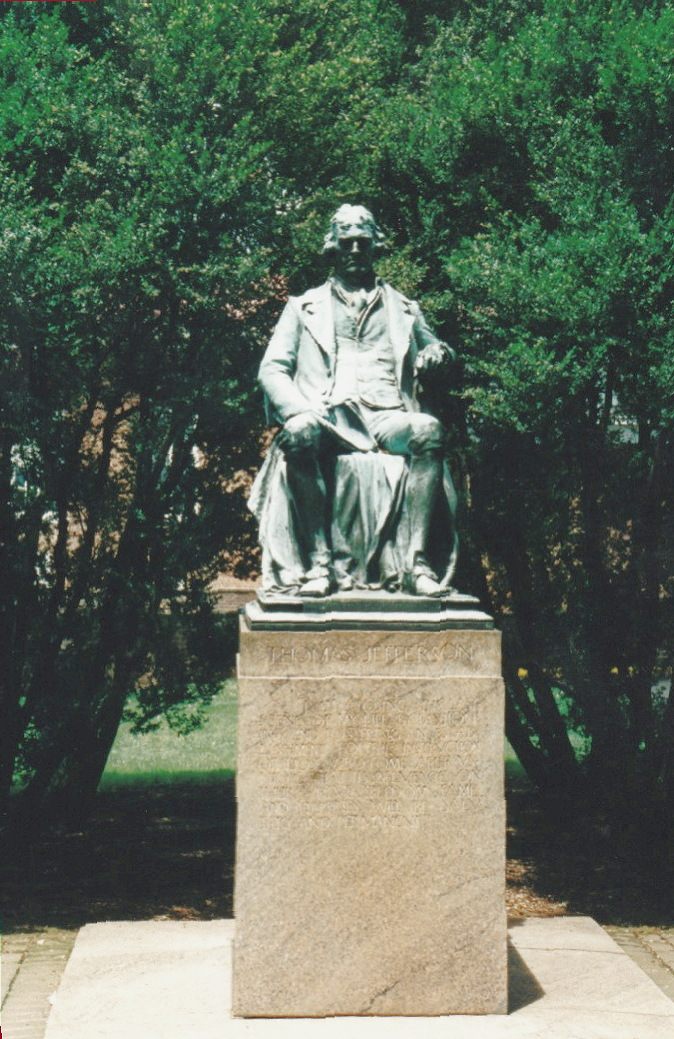
The statue at the University of Virginia, in Charlottesville

Shortly after the unveiling of the St. Louis statue, Bitter received a commission from Charles R. Crane and Edwin Alderman to create a replica of the Jefferson statue for the University of Virginia, a school to which Jefferson had strong ties. For this work Bitter slightly modified the previous statue, changing the position of the right arm slightly and aging Jefferson once again. This version was cast in bronze by the Roman Bronze Works, and dedicated on April 13, 1915, Jefferson's 172nd birthday and days after Bitter's death in a car accident.

=== Jefferson High School, Portland, Oregon ===
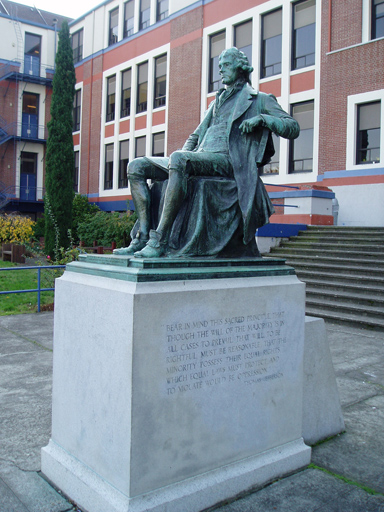
The statue at Jefferson High School in Portland, Oregon, in 2007

Another casting of the statue was located outside Jefferson High School in north Portland, Oregon. The statue, which overlooks the football and track fields on the north side of the school, depicts Jefferson seated on a draped chair with his arm resting on its back. His right arm rests in his lap and holds a pen and papers. The bronze measures 5 feet (1.5 m) x 2.5 feet (0.76 m) x 3.5 feet (1.1 m) and sits on a stone base that measures 5 feet (1.5 m) x 3.5 feet (1.1 m) x 4 feet (1.2 m).

One inscription displays: KARL BITTER ROMAN BRONZE WORKS NEW YORK, NY. The front of the plinth reads: THE GIFT OF THE ALUMNI AND STUDENTS OF JEFFERSON HIGH SCHOOL AND / BOARD OF DIRECTORS OF SCHOOL DISTRICT NUMBER ONE / JUNE 1915. The base's west side displays: BEAR IN MIND THIS SACRED PRINCIPAL, THAT / THOUGH THE WILL OF THE MAJORITY IS IN / ALL CASES TO PREVAIL, THAT WILL, TO BE / RIGHTFUL, MUST BE REASONABLE; THAT THE / MINORITY POSSESS THEIR EQUAL RIGHTS, / WHICH EQUAL LAWS MUST PROTECT, / AND TO VIOLATE WOULD BE OPPRESSION." / THOMAS JEFFERSON. The east side of the base includes inscriptions of the foundry Roman Bronze Works' mark as well as the text: THE GREATEST SERVICE WHICH CAN BE / RENDERED TO ANY COUNTRY IS TO ADD / A USEFUL PLANT TO ITS CULTURE." / THOMAS JEFFERSON.

Jefferson High School graduates suggested installing a statue of the president on the campus in June 1913. The statue was dedicated in May 1916, having been funded by alumni, current students, and members of School District Number One's board of directors, who pledged to match the students' donation. In all $2,400 was raised for the work. It was surveyed and considered "treatment needed" by the Smithsonian Institution's "Save Outdoor Sculpture!" program in December 1993. On June 14, 2020, the statue was pushed onto the ground during one of the George Floyd protests.

=== Thomas Jefferson High School, Brooklyn ===
In 1929, Bitter's widow and the Thomas Jefferson Memorial Foundation donated a plaster cast of the sculpture to Thomas Jefferson High School in Brooklyn.

== See also ==
- 1911 in art
- List of monuments and memorials removed during the George Floyd protests
- List of sculptures of presidents of the United States
- List of statues of Thomas Jefferson

== Sources ==
- Campen, Richard N. (1980). Outdoor Sculpture in Ohio. Chagrin Falls, Ohio: West Summit Press.
- Dennis, James M. (1967). Karl Bitter: Architectural Sculptor, 1867–1915. Madison: University of Wisconsin Press.
- McCue, George (1988). Sculpture City, St. Louis: public sculpture in the "Gateway to the West". New York: Hudson Hills Press in association with Laumeier International Sculpture Park, St. Louis.
- Schevill, Ferdinand (1917). Karl Bitter: A Biography. University of Chicago Press.
