= Cuyahoga County Courthouse =

Local government building in the United States

- U.S. Historic district – Contributing property
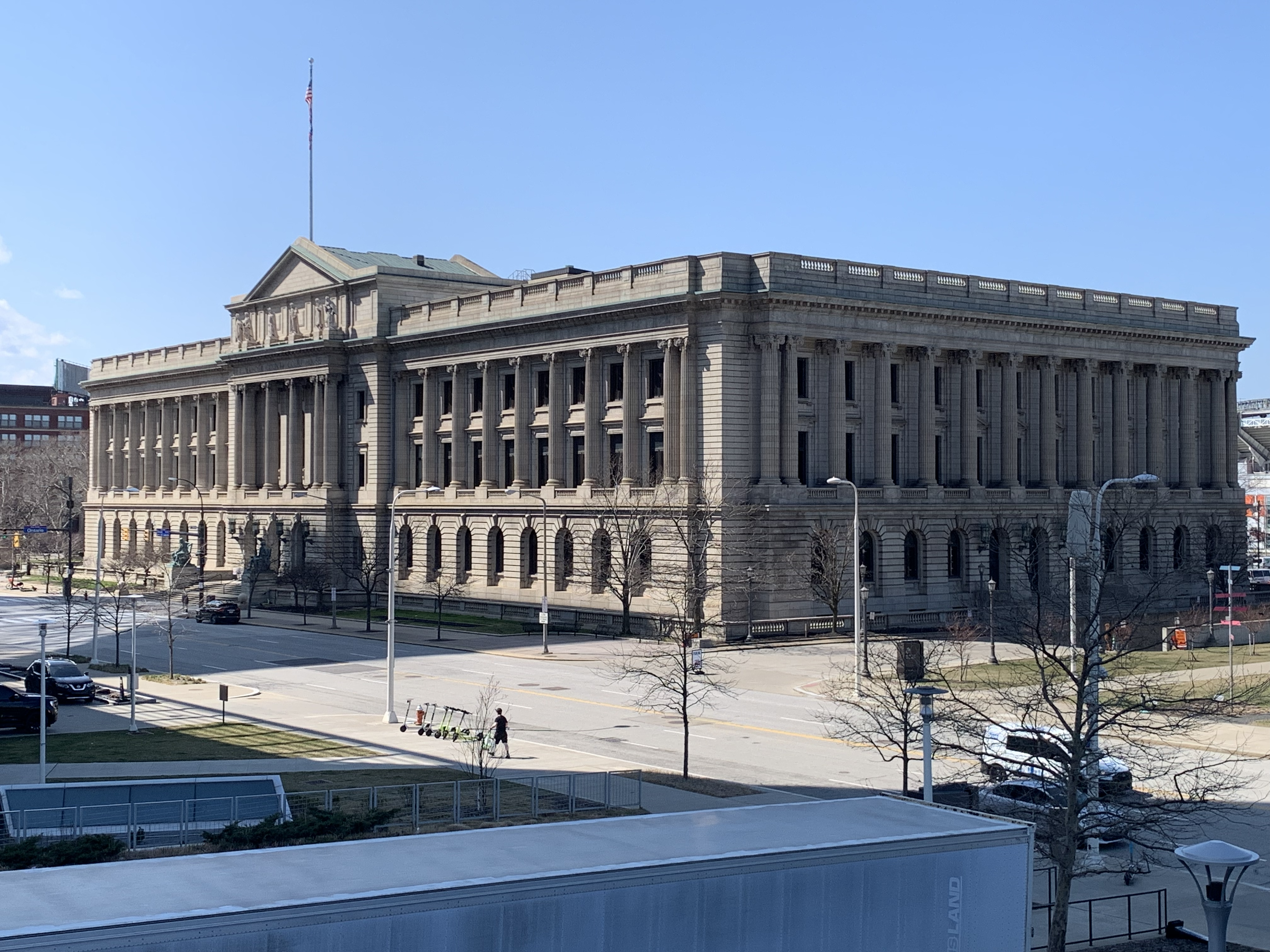
- Cuyahoga County Courthouse in Downtown Cleveland

- Location within Cleveland Location within Ohio Location within the United States
- Location: Cleveland, Ohio
- Coordinates: 41°30′12″N 81°41′49″W
- Architect: Lehman & Schmitt
- Architectural style: Beaux Arts
- Part of: Cleveland Mall (ID75001360)
- Added to NRHP: June 10, 1975

The Cuyahoga County Courthouse is a Beaux Arts style building that stretches along Lakeside Avenue at the north end of the Cleveland Mall in downtown Cleveland, Ohio. Completed in 1912 as the fifth courthouse in Cuyahoga County, it was constructed by the architectural firm of Lehman & Schmitt as a part of the Cleveland Group Plan of 1903. The building was listed on the National Register, along with the mall district, in 1975.

== History ==
Cuyahoga County was established in 1807 with the county seat still in the air. The county decided to place the temporary county seat in the largest settlement of Cleveland. The courts met in various taverns and inns around town while waiting for the courthouse to be built. This first courthouse was designed and built by Levi Johnson. The building was completed in 1813 and was a simple Federal style stone structure. The structure was five bays wide and two piles deep, with doors located in the center and to the right corner of the facade. A rectangular window was located between these doors with a smaller square window to the left of the central door. Five rectangular windows lit the second floor. The pitched roof was framed by brick chimneys on either end. The clapboard siding was painted red with white trim boards.

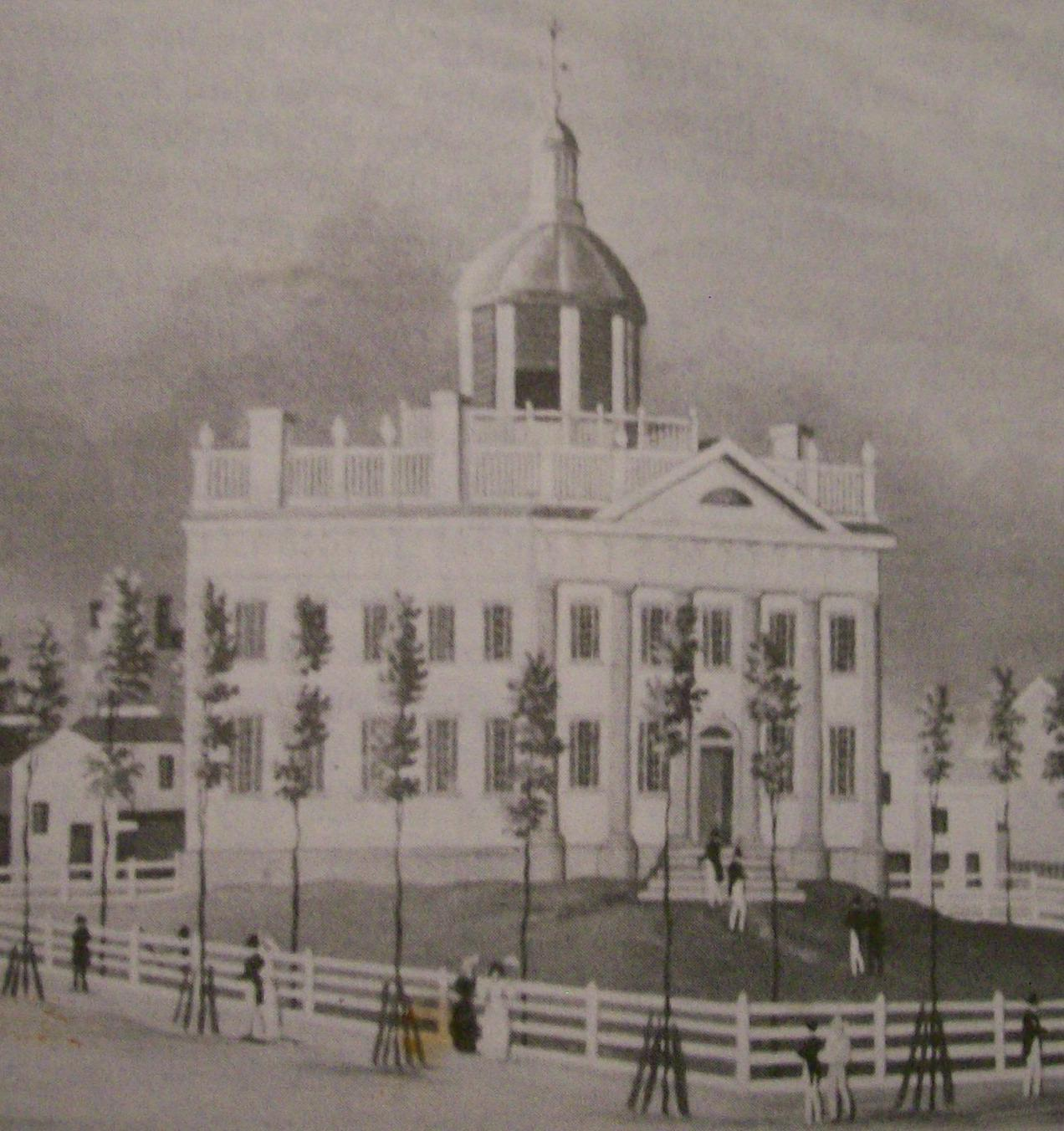
The second courthouse for Cuyahoga County.

The county occupied this courthouse when the decision was made to make Cleveland the permanent county seat. The county soon erected a new courthouse in 1828. Henry Noble built the new courthouse of brick two stories tall. The front of the courthouse was framed by four colossal Doric columns supporting an entablature. The interior was illuminated by large rectangular windows piercing the facade. The flat roof supported a cupola which located in the center of the building. The cupola rose on Ionic columns and supported a lantern capped by a weather vane. This courthouse remained in use until the 1850s.

The growth of Cleveland, and consequently the legal business of Cuyahoga County, had for some time foreshadowed the necessity for increased courthouse facilities, and action was taken in the period now under consideration. It was decided to clear Public Square permanently of official buildings, and accordingly a new structure and a new site were agreed upon. This latter was situated just north of the northwest corner of Public Square, on the north side of Rockwell street. On November 10, 1857, the County Commissioners contracted with George P. Smith and James Pannell to erect a substantial stone edifice, three stories high, at a cost of $152,500. The new third courthouse was designed by J.J. Husband, an amateur designer, built in 1858. This new building, built of stone was designed in the Italianate style. The building has a square footprint with a central entrance. The entrance is contained a slightly projected bay with two windows on either side. The windows in the basement are small arched panels with the main floor windows slightly larger. The second floor windows are large arched windows separated by Corinthian pilasters. A decorative frieze separated the second floor from the third floor and a pediment topping the center projection. A mansard roof tops the building with dormer windows lining the facade. Four large chimneys framed the building on the sides. This building, eventually called "the old court-house," filled all the requirements of county business until 1875.

Ground was then purchased on Seneca Street (West 3rd St.), running back to the county jail on Rockwell street, and a contract let for a new court-house, at a cost of $250,000. So, in 1875 a 4th courthouse was constructed. It was nearly square, running seventy feet in each direction with rooms for various officials and the courts in the Seneca (West 3rd St.) front of the building, with the jail in the rear.

In 1884 the county was faced with a problem of room and space in the courtroom and the decision was made to expand the current building than to build a new one. Therefore, a still further increase of facilities was made in 1884, when two stories were added to the old building on public square, at a cost of nearly $100,000. The building transformed from a 2 1/2-story building to a 5-story building. The facade was changed as well with the central projection going from one arched window to three arched windows on the second and third floor and four arched windows on the fourth and fifth. To either side of the central projection is an arched window. A larger pediment tops the projection with dentil moldings lining the overhangs. The hipped roof rose to support a small gabled tower with a decorative frieze. The chimneys on the sides were built up to rise over the roof and were each equipped with pipes that ventilated many fireplaces and heaters.

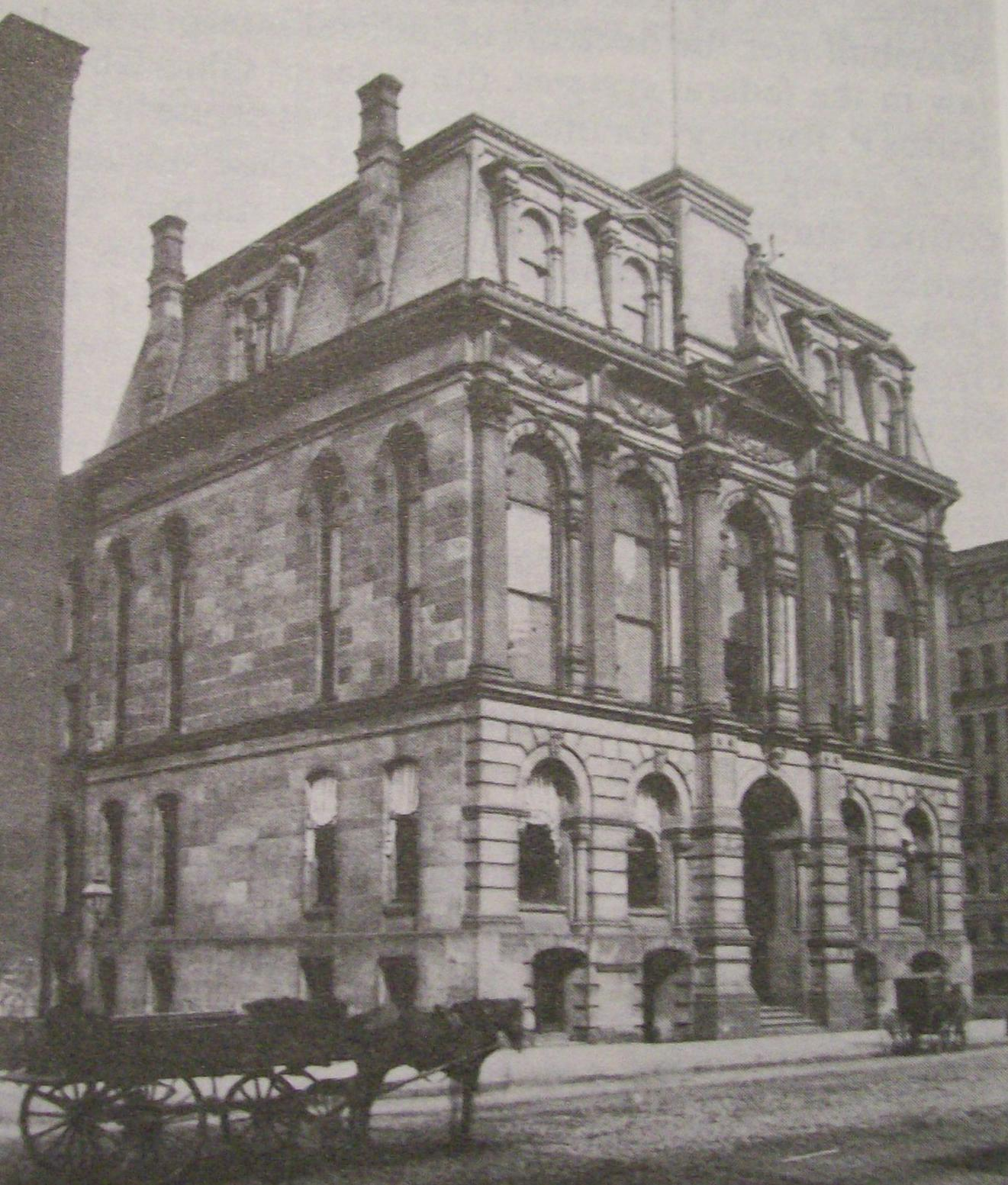
The fourth courthouse located on Seneca Street built in 1875

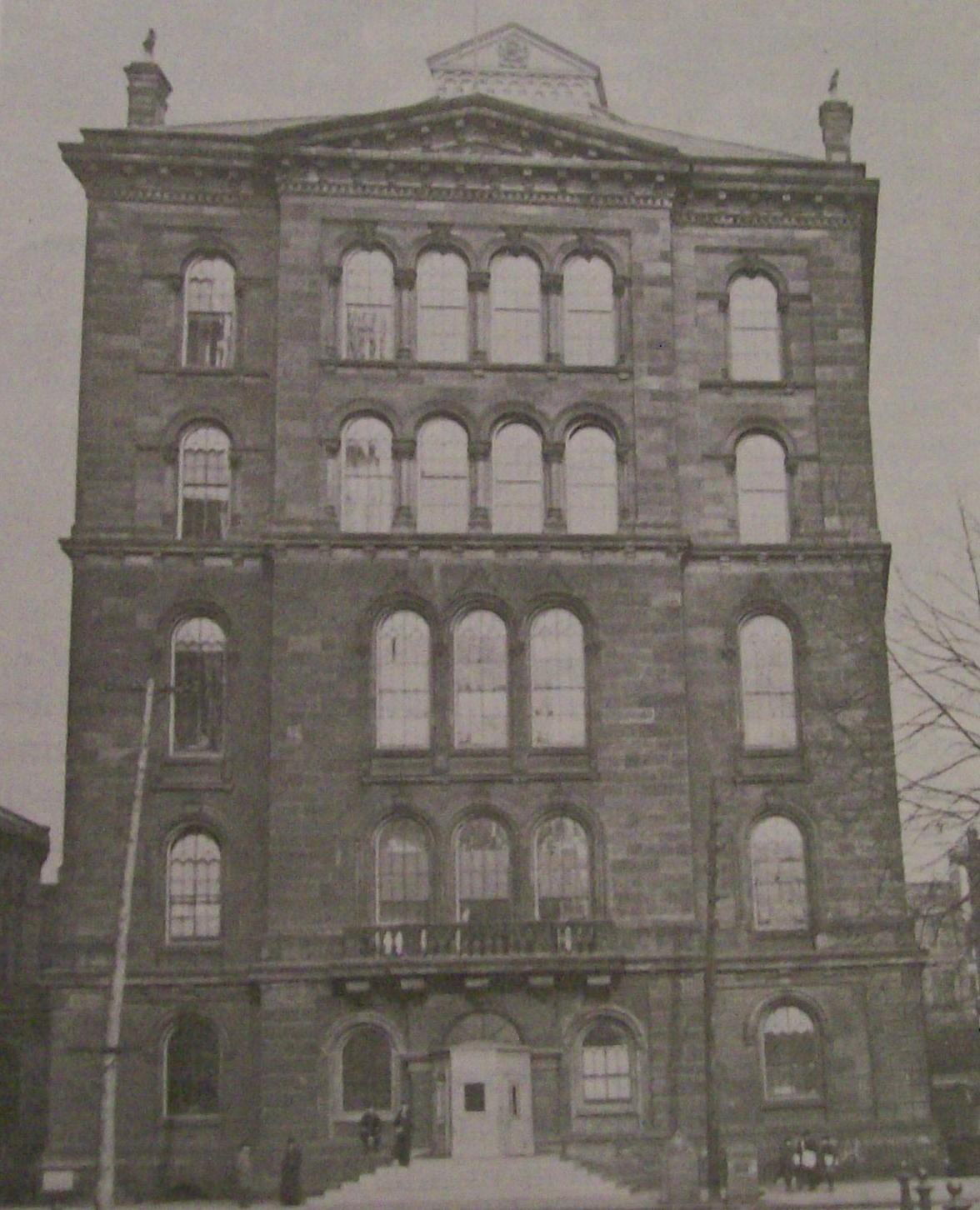
The third courthouse built between 1858 and 1860 on Public Square after the remodel of 1884.

The county was in need once again of larger facilities for county operations and the design was awarded to Walter Blythe. The site that was chosen was along the Cleveland Mall and was designed in the style that matched many of the Beaux Arts style of the federal buildings sprouting along the Washington D.C. Mall. It is one of several buildings built as part of the Cleveland Group Plan of 1903, an early City Beautiful-era city plan designed by Daniel Burnham, Arnold Brunner, and John Carrere. All previous courthouses have since been demolished.

== Exterior ==
The building was constructed from 1906 to 1912 by the architectural firm of Lehman & Schmitt. The building is Beaux Arts style and is constructed of Milford pink granite from Massachusetts. The rusticated masonry of the ground floor includes deeply recessed and arched windows and doors. A protruding keystone tops each one. The front entrance is flanked by bronze statues of Thomas Jefferson and Alexander Hamilton sculpted by Karl Bitter. Directly above the front entry doors are three large arched windows between fluted columns of the Ionic order allowing daylight into the courtroom within. The frieze of the cornice includes the inscription "Cuyahoga County Courthouse". Above the cornice are several stone statues of historical law givers. Two of these figures, of Edward I and John Hampden, were sculpted by Daniel Chester French. The rear elevation facing Lake Erie is composed similarly, but with the inscription "Obedience to Law is Liberty". A pediment with a plain tympanum surmounts the central element of the facade on both the north and south elevations. A statue of Alfred the Great stands on the north side of the building.

The interior contains murals by Frank Brangwyn, Violet Oakley, Charles Yardley Turner, Max Bohm and Frederick Wilson.

== See also ==
- Justice Center Complex
- Yule marble
