= Karl Bitter =

American sculptor (1867–1915)

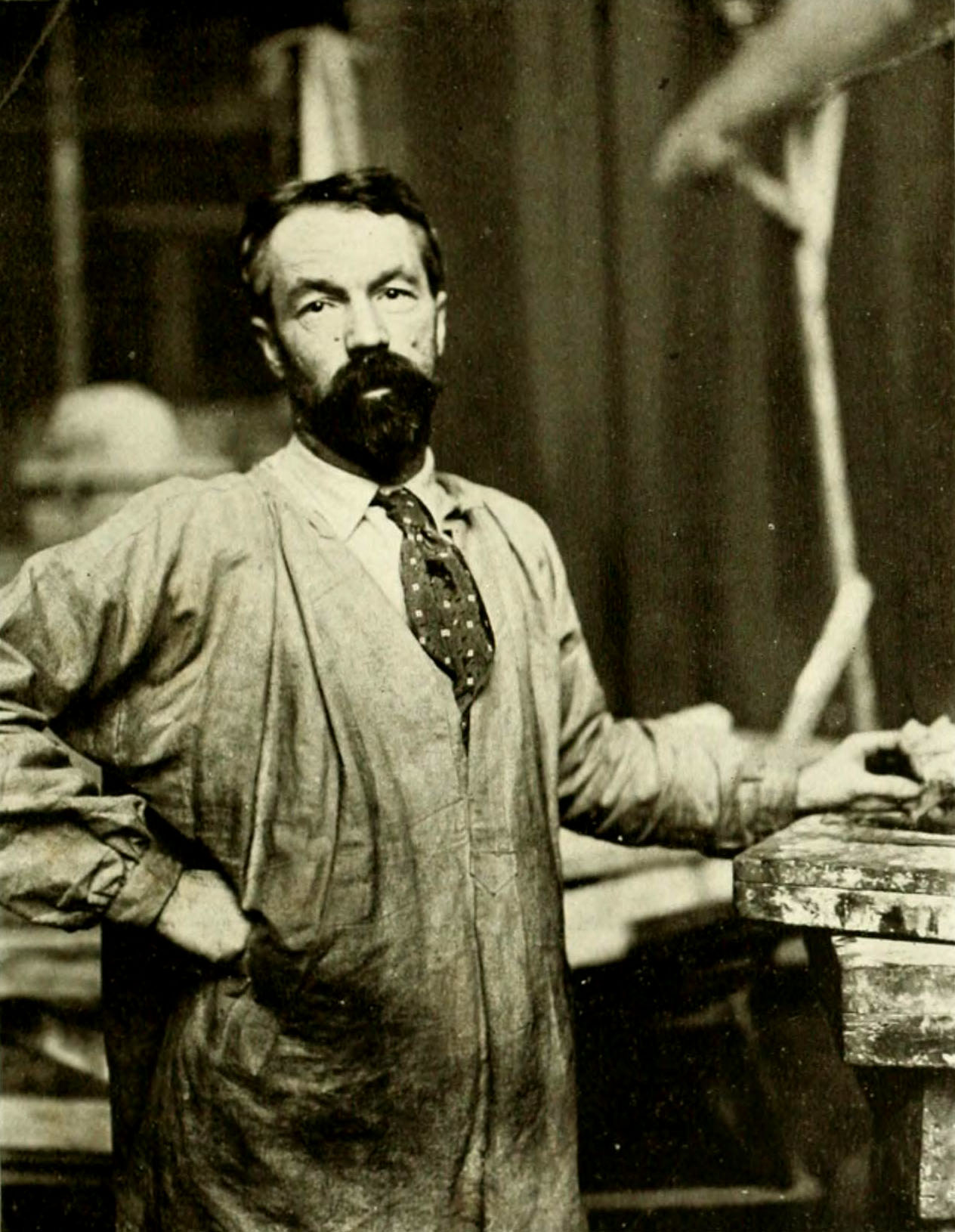
- Karl Bitter in 1907
- Born: Karl Theodore Francis Bitter; December 6, 1867; Rudolfsheim-Fünfhaus, Vienna, Austria
- Died: April 9, 1915 (aged 47); Manhattan, New York City
- Education: Academy of Fine Arts Vienna
- Spouse: Marie Schevill
- Children: Francis Bitter

Karl Theodore Francis Bitter (December 6, 1867 – April 9, 1915) was an Austrian-born American sculptor best known for his architectural sculpture, memorials and residential work.

== Life and career ==
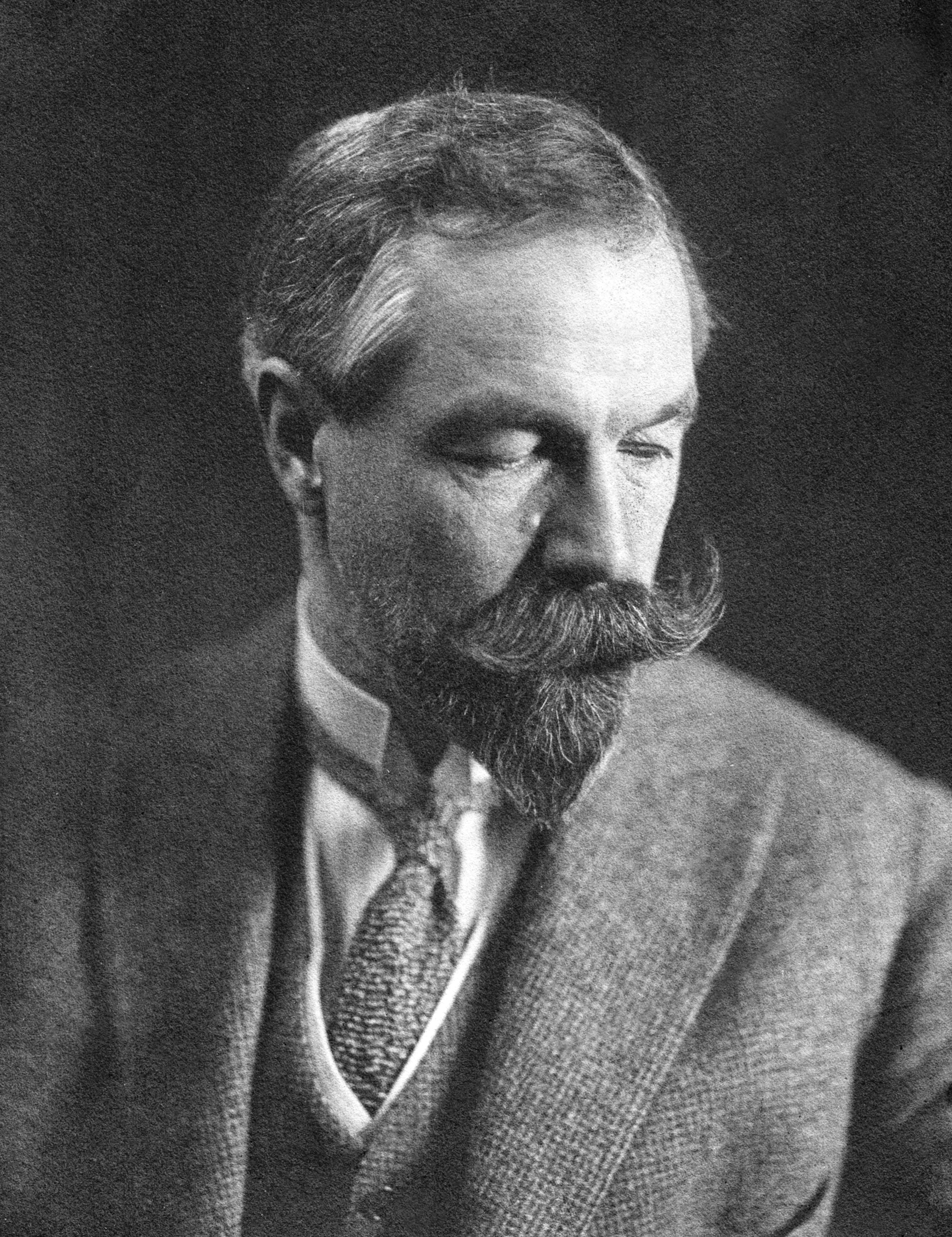
Karl Bitter in 1905

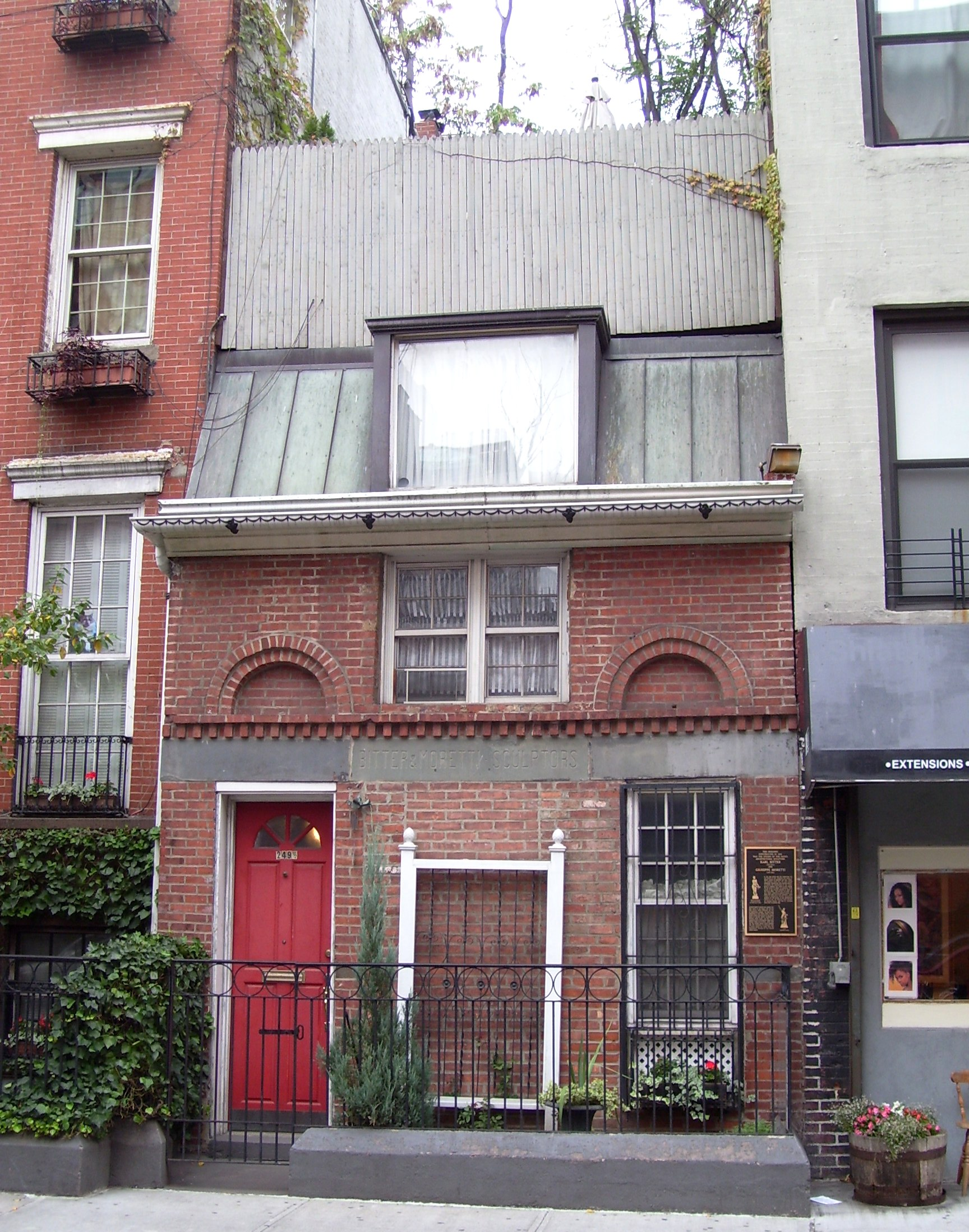
Manhattan studio that Bitter shared with Giuseppe Moretti

The son of Carl and Henrietta Bitter, he was born in the municipal district Rudolfsheim-Fünfhaus of Vienna. His early training took place at the Vienna Kunstgewerbeschule (the imperial school for the applied arts), and after that at the Kunstakademie (the Academy of Fine Arts). At the Academy, he studied with August Kühne and Edmund Heller. Upon his graduation, he was apprenticed to an architectural sculptor, Joseph Kaffsack. This was the period that the Ringstraße was being built in Vienna, and a large number of decorated buildings were being built.

He was drafted into the Austrian Army, and deserted while on leave. He was unable to return to Austria for many years because of his desertion. He later was pardoned by Emperor Franz Josef of Austria, who hoped to lure the famous sculptor back to Vienna.

Bitter immigrated to the United States in 1889, arriving in New York City. He applied for citizenship, and set to work as an assistant with a firm of Ellin, Kitson & Co. ("The Founder of American Architectural Decoration," Stone volume XXIV, no. 4. (Apr. 1902): pp. 343–345.) While employed with this firm, at age 21, he competed for the Astor memorial bronze gates of Trinity Church and won. The work gave him sufficient capital to build and establish a small studio on 13th Street.

Bitter modeled seated statues of Thomas Jefferson and Alexander Hamilton to flank the entrance to the Cuyahoga County Courthouse in Cleveland, Ohio (1909–11). He portrayed the men in early middle age, as in the 1780s when they clashed over what kind of nation the United States should become. Missouri commissioned a copy of Jefferson (1913), and Bitter made minor alterations to portray Jefferson as he looked as president when he signed the Louisiana Purchase Treaty in 1803. For the commission from the University of Virginia, Bitter aged Jefferson further, portraying him as he looked in retirement.

About this time, Bitter was discovered by Richard Morris Hunt, the architect of choice of many of New York's rich and famous. From that time on Bitter was never without work. After working as a sculptor at the World's Columbian Exposition in Chicago in 1893 and as director at the Pan-American Exposition in Buffalo, New York in 1901, Bitter's extraordinary organizational skills led him to be named head of the sculpture programs at both the 1904 St. Louis Exposition in St. Louis, Missouri, where Lee Lawrie trained with his guidance, and the 1915 Panama–Pacific International Exposition held in San Francisco, California. In 1906/1907, he presided over the National Sculpture Society.

Among the awards won by Bitter were the silver medal of the Paris Exposition, 1900; the gold medal of the Pan-American Exposition, 1901; a gold medal at Philadelphia, 1902; and the gold medal at the St. Louis Exposition, 1904. He was a member of the National Institute of Arts and Sciences, vice-president (1906–08 and 1914–15); the National Academy of Design, to which he was elected in 1902; the American Academy of Arts and Letters, Players' Club, Century Club, and vice-president of the Architectural League from 1904 to 1906 and from 1909 to 1911, and member of the Art Commission, New York, from 1912 to 1915.

Although Bitter arose out of the Classical/Naturalist styles he was increasingly turning towards a more modern approach to sculpture. Much of the work in Buffalo and St. Louis was allegorical in nature. Where this would have taken him will never be known, because he was killed in a traffic collision in 1915 when, while leaving the Metropolitan Opera House in New York, the driver of a car jumped the curb on Broadway and struck him down. His wife survived the crash as he had pushed her out of the way of the oncoming driver.

Like many of the sculptors and painters of the day, Bitter frequently employed the services of the muse and history's first "super model", Audrey Munson. On June 30, 1901, he married Marie A. Schevill, of Cincinnati, Ohio. They had three children: Francis T. R. Bitter, Marietta C. E. Bitter and John F. Bitter. Their son Francis Bitter, born in 1902, became a prominent American physicist.

For a time, Bitter's studio was located in a building known as The Castle in Weehawken, New Jersey. The Castle was created as a part of the Eldorado Amusement Park. At the time of his death, Bitter resided at 44 West 77th Street in Manhattan, New York.

== Architectural sculpture ==
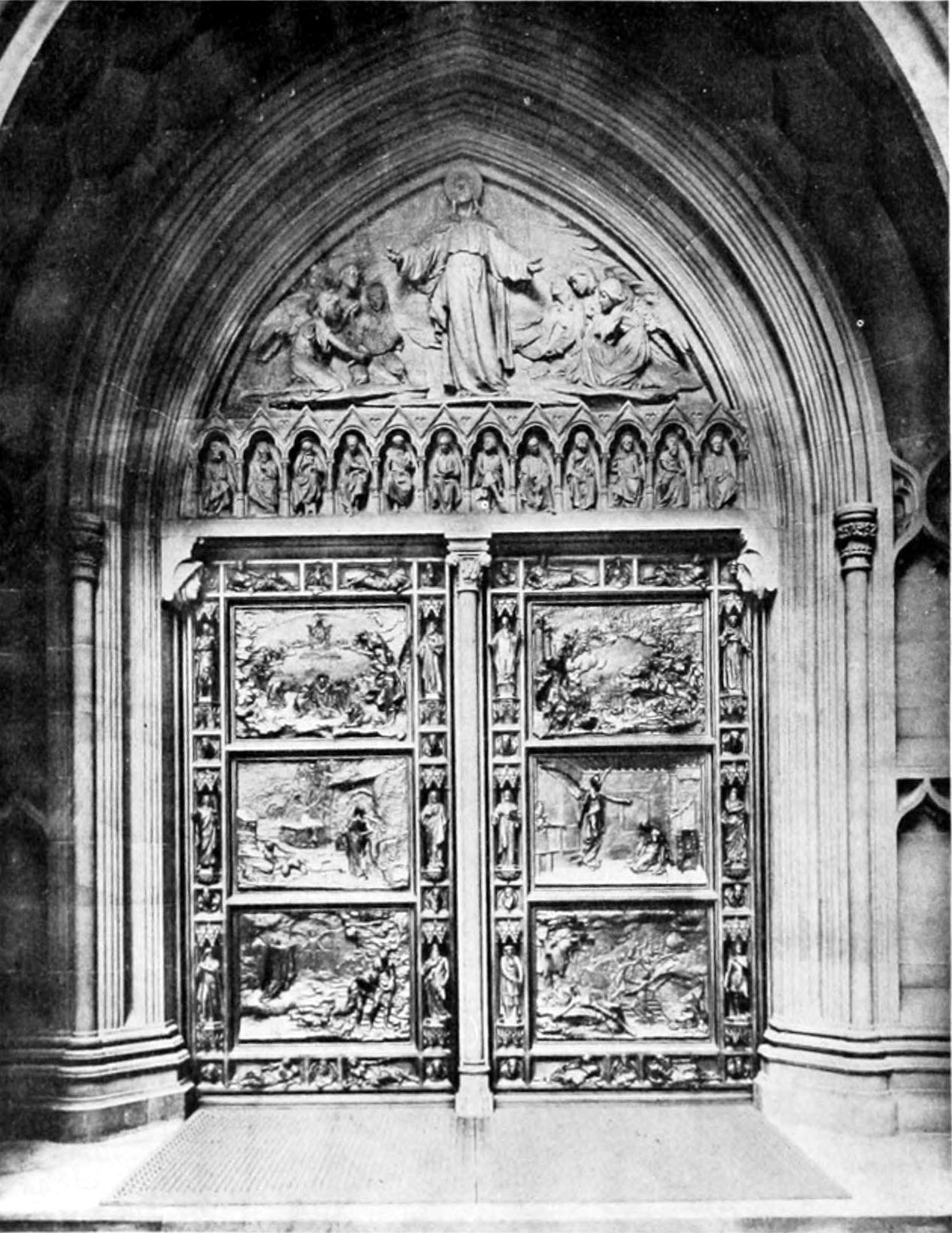
East doors and tympanum (1891), Trinity Church, New York

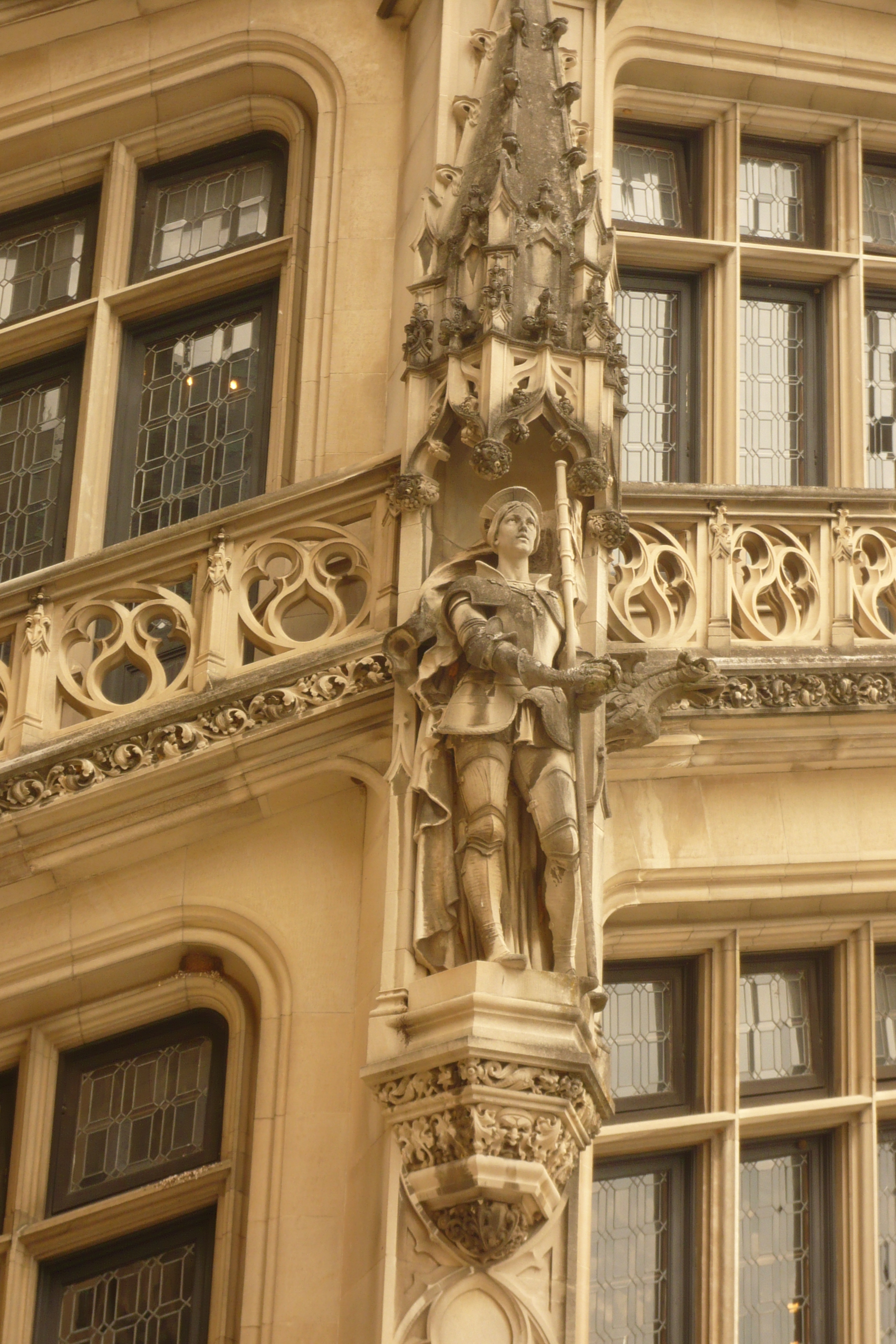
Joan of Arc (1895), Biltmore Estate, Asheville, North Carolina

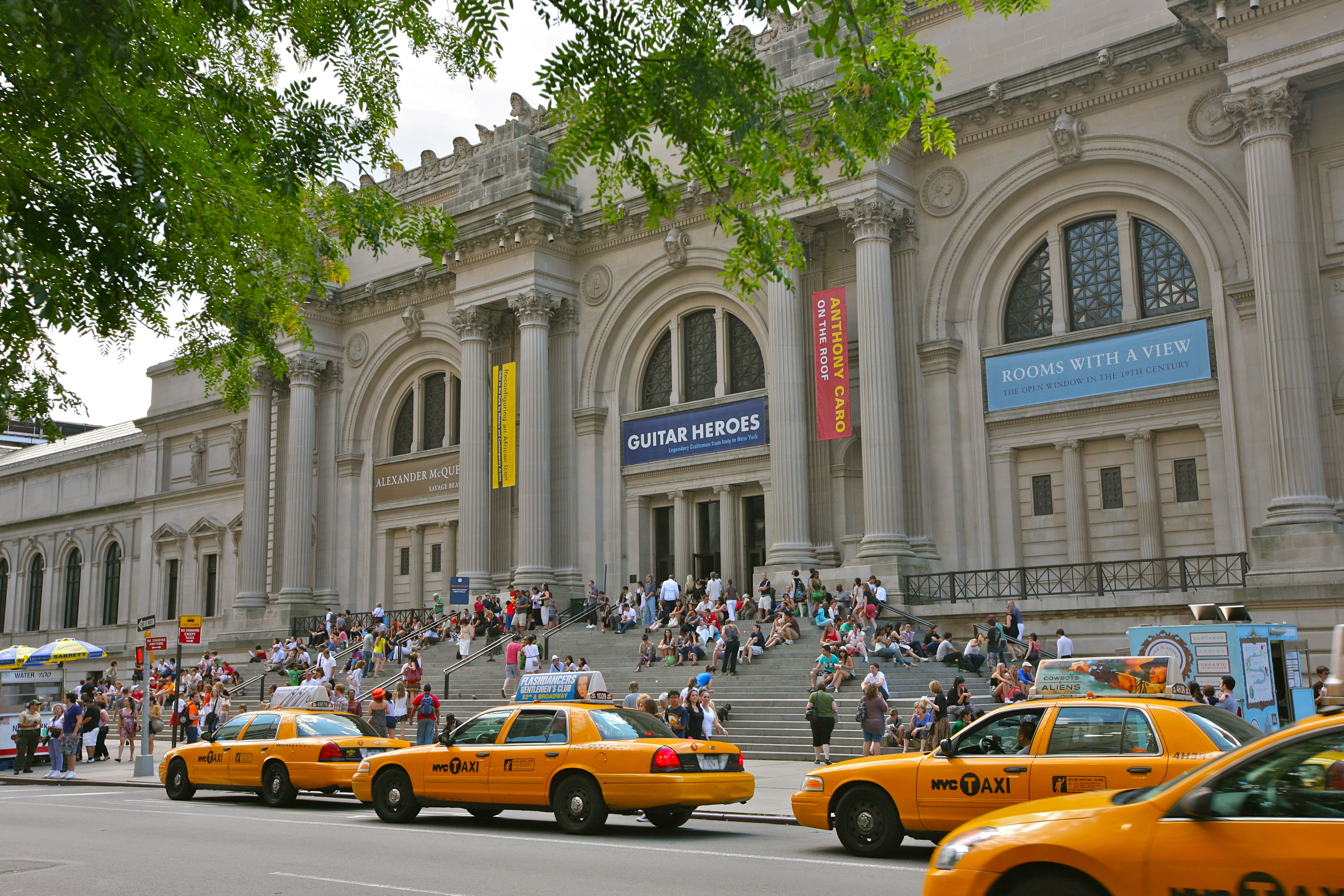
Metropolitan Museum of Art, Fifth Avenue, New York City. Note Bitter's portrait medallions on the spandrels above the arches, his caryatids at left, and the limestone blocks above the paired columns for his unexecuted sculpture groups.

- East Doors and Tympanum, Trinity Church, New York, 1891
- Elements Controlled and Uncontrolled, 1893, Administration Building, World's Columbian Exposition, Chicago, Illinois, destroyed
- Broad Street Station, 1894, Pennsylvania Railroad, Philadelphia, Frank Furness architect:
  - Spirit of Transportation (plaster), length: 30 ft (9.14 m), interior of waiting room. Now located in 30th Street Station.
  - Elements of Fire and Water Tamed and Harnessed in Service to Man, pediment over 15th Street tunnel, (terra cotta), length: 50 ft (15.24 m), destroyed.
  - 10 relief panels commemorating cities served by the PRR (terra cotta), exterior of train shed, destroyed.
  - Sculpture group surrounding clock (terra cotta), exterior, destroyed.
  - 3 pedimental relief panels (terra cotta), exterior, destroyed.
- Horace Jayne House, 1895, 19th & Delancey Streets, Philadelphia, Pennsylvania, Frank Furness, architect, 4 pedimental relief panels of musicians (terra cotta), exterior.
- Biltmore Estate, 1895, Asheville, North Carolina, Richard Morris Hunt, architect:
  - Heroic statue of Joan of Arc (limestone), on exterior of staircase.
  - Heroic statue of St. Louis (limestone), on exterior of staircase.
  - Contest of the Minstrels (oak frieze), banquet hall.
  - The Return from the Chase (stone frieze), over banquet hall fireplace.
  - Boy Stealing Geese (bronze), palm garden fountain.
  - Venus and Vulcan Andirons (steel), library.
- Metropolitan Museum of Art's Fifth Avenue building, Manhattan, New York City, Richard Morris Hunt architect:
  - 6 portrait medallions (c. 1895): Velasquez, Raphael, Durer, Rembrandt, Michelangelo, Bramante, spandrels over main entrance.
  - 4 caryatids (1899): Painting, Sculpture, Architecture, Music, Fifth Avenue façade.
  - Bitter's sculpture groups of The Arts (1901) were never executed in stone. The uncarved blocks for them remain atop the paired columns of the Fifth Avenue facade.
- St Paul Building – George B. Post architect, New York City, 1896
  - When this building was demolished in 1958, Bitter's three caryatids ended up at Holliday Park in Indianapolis after some debate about sending them to Vienna, Austria.
- Decorations on the Dewey Arch – New York, 1899
- Cornell Memorial Pulpit and Choir Rail (1900), All Angels' Episcopal Church, Manhattan, New York City. Now in the collection of the Metropolitan Museum of Art.
- United States Customs House – Cass Gilbert architect, New York City, 1906
- Cleveland Trust Company – George B. Post architect, Cleveland, Ohio, 1907
- First National Bank – J. Milton Dyer architect, Cleveland, Ohio, 1908
- 4 eagles and 4 globes (1909, granite), Monument to United States Regulars, Gettysburg National Military Park, Gettysburg, Pennsylvania.
- Cuyahoga County Courthouse, Cleveland, Ohio, Lehman & Schmidt, architects:
  - Lord John Somers (1911, marble), atop façade cornice.
  - Lord Mansfield (1911, marble), atop facade cornice.
- Wisconsin State Capitol, Madison, George B. Post, architect:
  - Liberty Supported by the Law (1910, granite), East Pediment sculpture group.
  - Wisconsin State Resources (1917, granite), West Pediment sculpture group.
  - 4 sculpture groups (1912): Knowledge, Strength, Faith, Prosperity and Abundance, around base of dome.
- Prudential Lions, originally for the Prudential Headquarters, in Newark, New Jersey.

== Monuments and other works ==
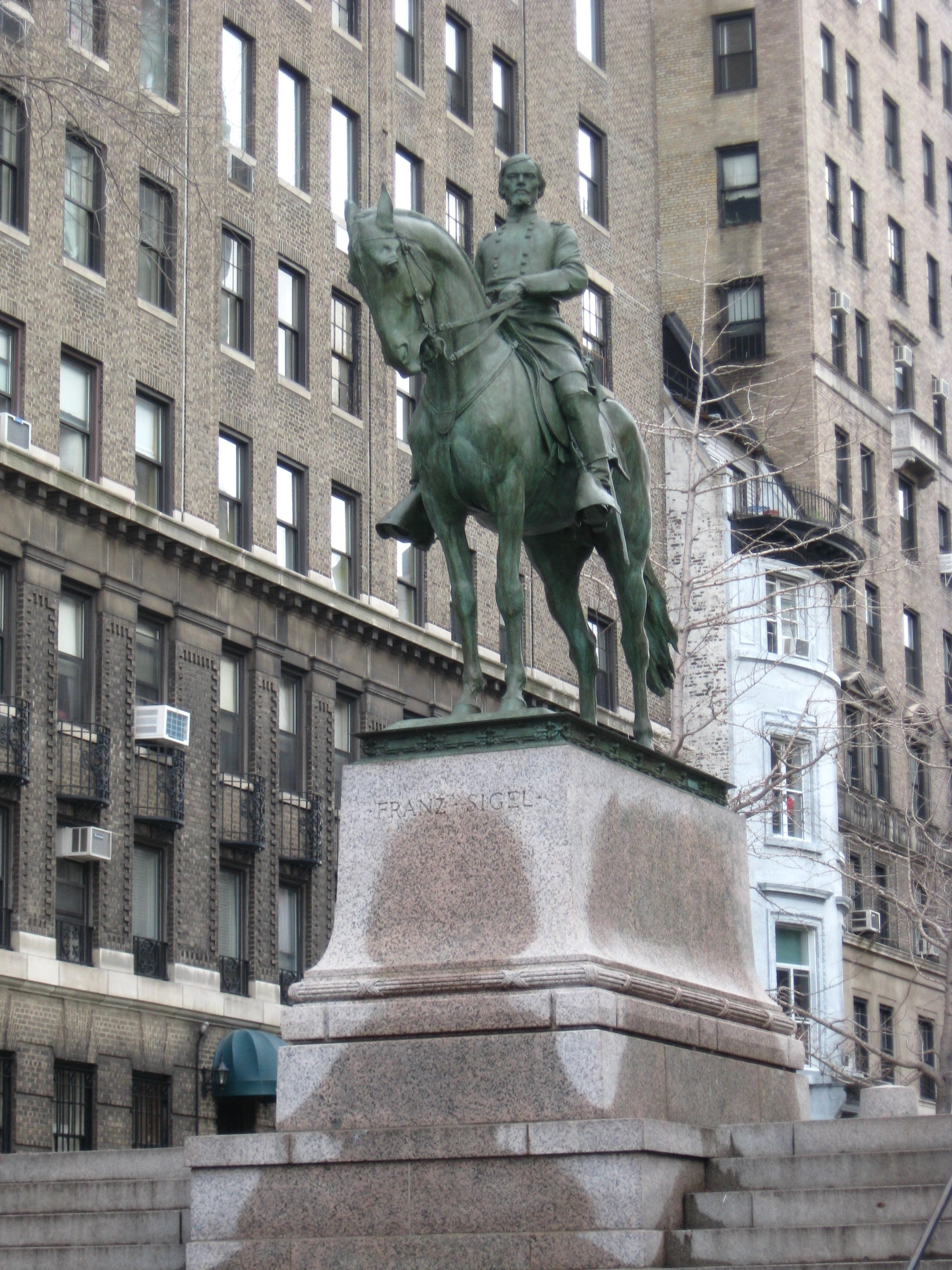
Franz Sigel (1907), Riverside Park, New York City

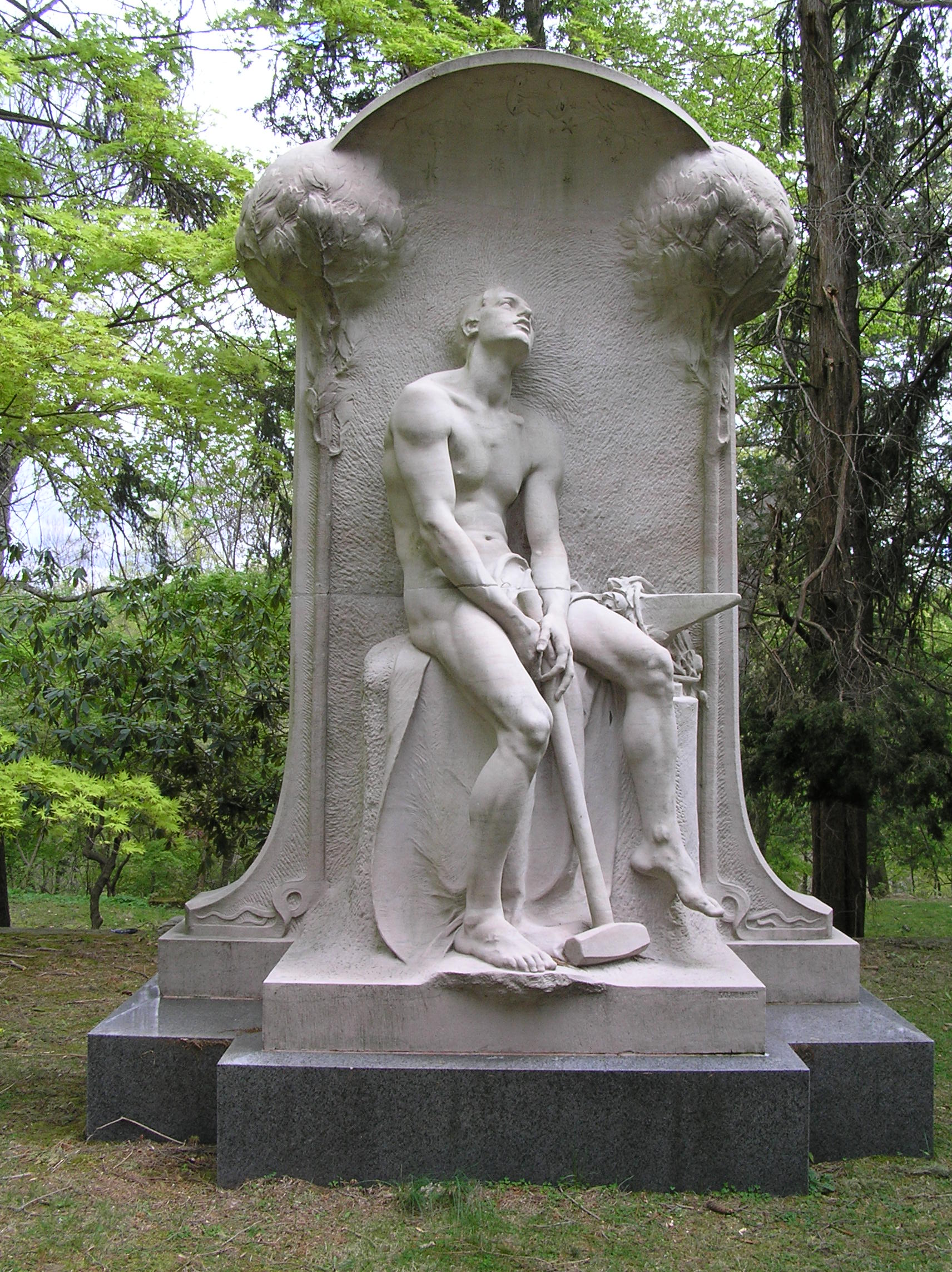
Henry Villard Memorial (1904), Sleepy Hollow, New York

- Dr. William Pepper (1895, bronze), south side of College Hall, University of Pennsylvania.
  - Dr. William Pepper (1899, bronze), Free Library of Philadelphia, Philadelphia, Pennsylvania.
- Breckenridge Memorial Tablet (1902, bronze), United States Naval Academy, Annapolis, Maryland.
- Signing the Treaty (later known as Louisiana Purchase Group) (1904, staff), Louisiana Purchase Exposition, St. Louis.
  - Model for Louisiana Purchase Group (undated, plaster), St. Louis Art Museum, St. Louis, Missouri.
  - Louisiana Purchase Group (1913, bronze), Missouri History Museum, St. Louis.
- Equestrian statue of General Franz Sigel (1907, bronze), Riverside Park, Riverside Drive & 108th Street, Manhattan, New York City.
- William Henry Baldwin Jr. Memorial Tablet (1909, marble), Tuskegee Institute, Tuskegee, Alabama.
- Dr. James Burrill Angell Memorial Tablet (1909, bronze), Alumni Memorial Hall, University of Michigan, Ann Arbor, Michigan.
- Alexander Hamilton (1911, bronze), flanking main entrance to Cuyahoga County Courthouse, Cleveland, Ohio.
- Thomas Jefferson (1911, bronze), flanking main entrance to Cuyahoga County Courthouse, Cleveland, Ohio. First version.
- Thomas Jefferson (1913, marble), Missouri History Museum, Forest Park, St. Louis, Missouri. Second version.
  - Model for Thomas Jefferson (undated, plaster), St. Louis Art Museum, St. Louis, Missouri.
- Thomas Jefferson (1915, bronze), University of Virginia, Charlottesville. Third version.
  - Thomas Jefferson (1915, bronze), Jefferson High School, Portland, Oregon.
- Henry Philip Tappan Memorial (1913, bronze), Tappan Hall, University of Michigan, Ann Arbor, Michigan.
- Carl Schurz Monument (1913, bronze), Morningside Park, Manhattan, New York City.
  - Carl Schurz Monument (1914, bronze), Menominee Park, Oshkosh, Wisconsin.
- Thomas Lowry Monument (1915, bronze), Smith Triangle Park, Minneapolis, Minnesota.
- Andrew Dickson White (1915, bronze), outside Goldwin Smith Hall, Cornell University, Ithaca, New York.

=== Funerary ===
- Thanatos (1903, bronze), John Erastus Hubbard Memorial, Montpelier, Vermont.
- The End of the Day's Work (1904, marble), Henry Villard Memorial – Sleepy Hollow, New York.
- Fountain for cemetery, (1909), Dayton, Ohio
- Faded Flowers (1911, marble), Prehn Mausoleum, Cedar Lawn Cemetery Paterson, New Jersey. Henry Bacon, architect; carved by Piccirilli Brothers.
- Fear Not the Night (1915, marble), Louise Dellmayer Kasson Memorial, Forest Hills Cemetery, Utica, New York.

=== Posthumous ===
- Pomona (1916, bronze), Pulitzer Fountain, Grand Army Plaza, Manhattan, New York City. Completed by Isidore Konti and Karl Gruppe.
- Depew Memorial Fountain (1919, bronze), Indiana World War Memorial Plaza, Indianapolis, Indiana. Completed by Alexander Stirling Calder.
- Louisiana Purchase Group (by 1929, bronze), Missouri State Capitol, Jefferson City, Missouri. Adolph Alexander Weinman oversaw the posthumous casting and designed the sculpture's granite setting.
- Heroic statue of Henry Hudson (1939, bronze), Henry Hudson Park, Bronx, New York City. Commissioned in 1909, it was completed from Bitter's plaster model by Karl Gruppe.

== Gallery ==
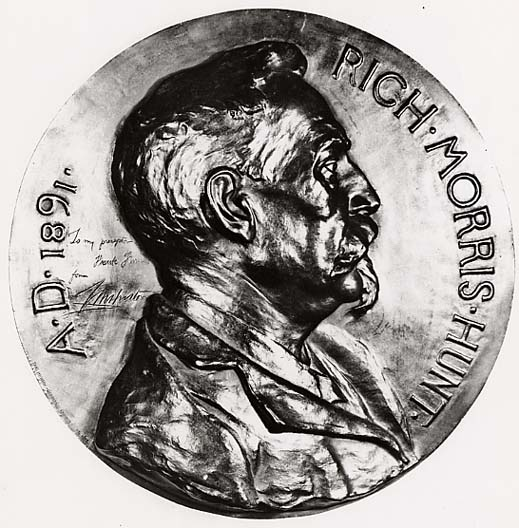
Bronze bust of architect Richard Morris Hunt (1891), National Portrait Gallery, Washington D.C.

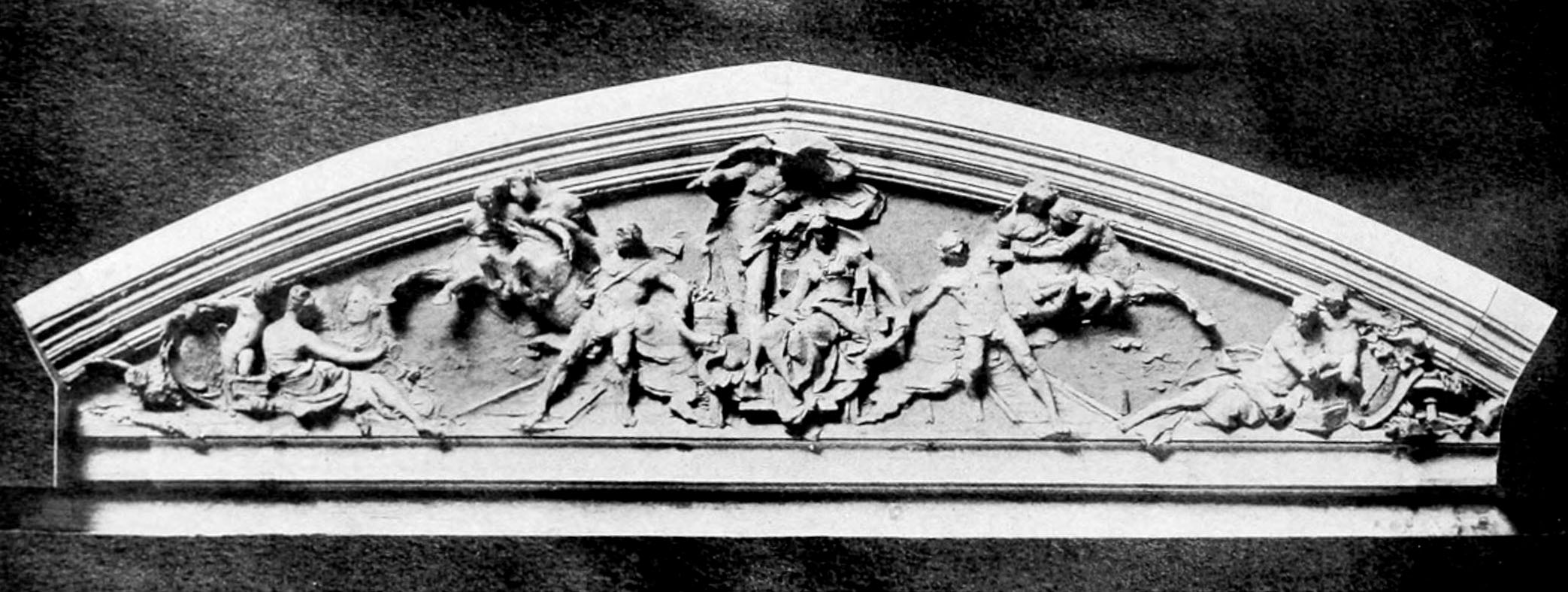
Model for Pediment over 15th Street, Broad Street Station, Philadelphia, Pennsylvania (1894, destroyed)

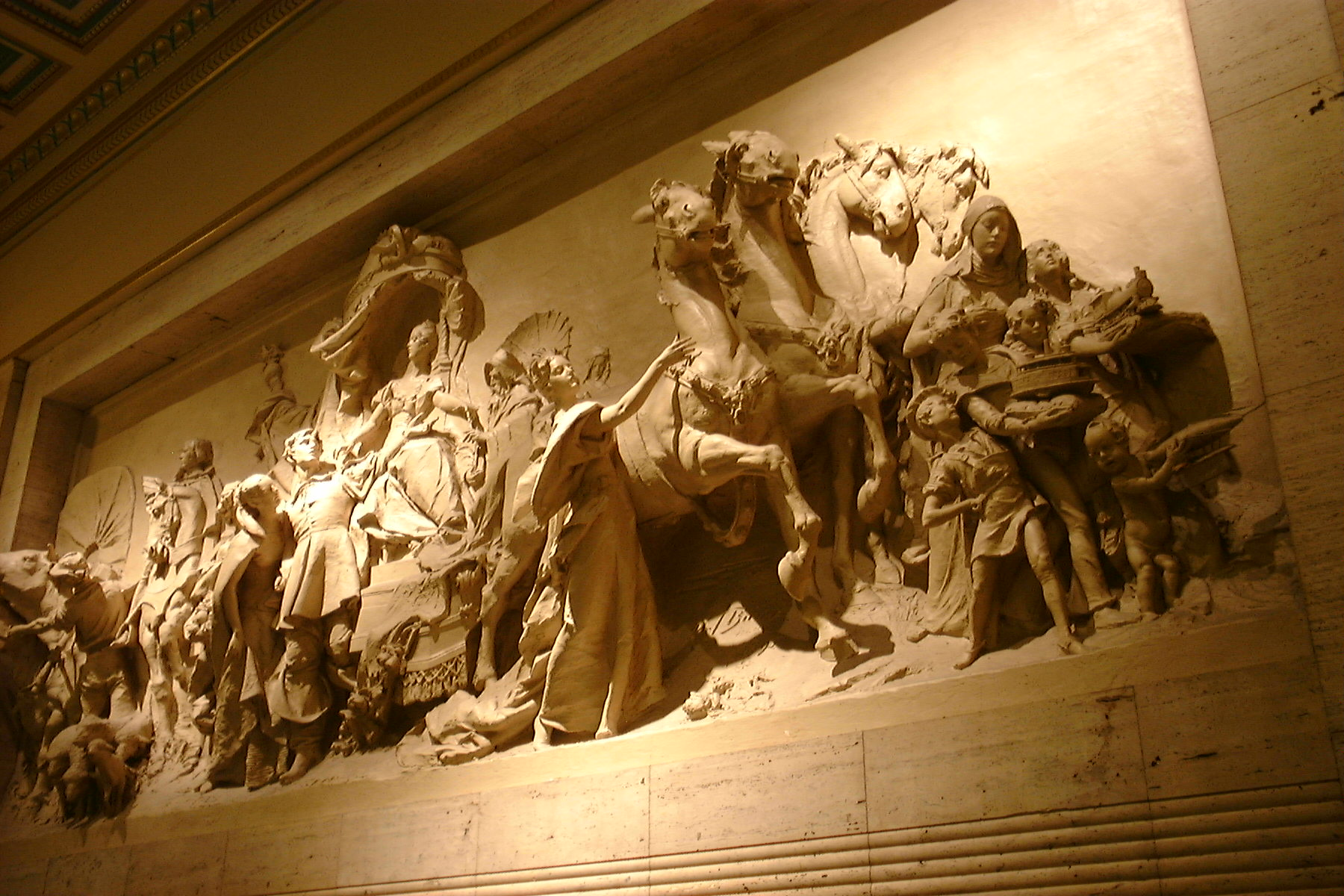
Spirit of Transportation (1894), 30th Street Station, Philadelphia

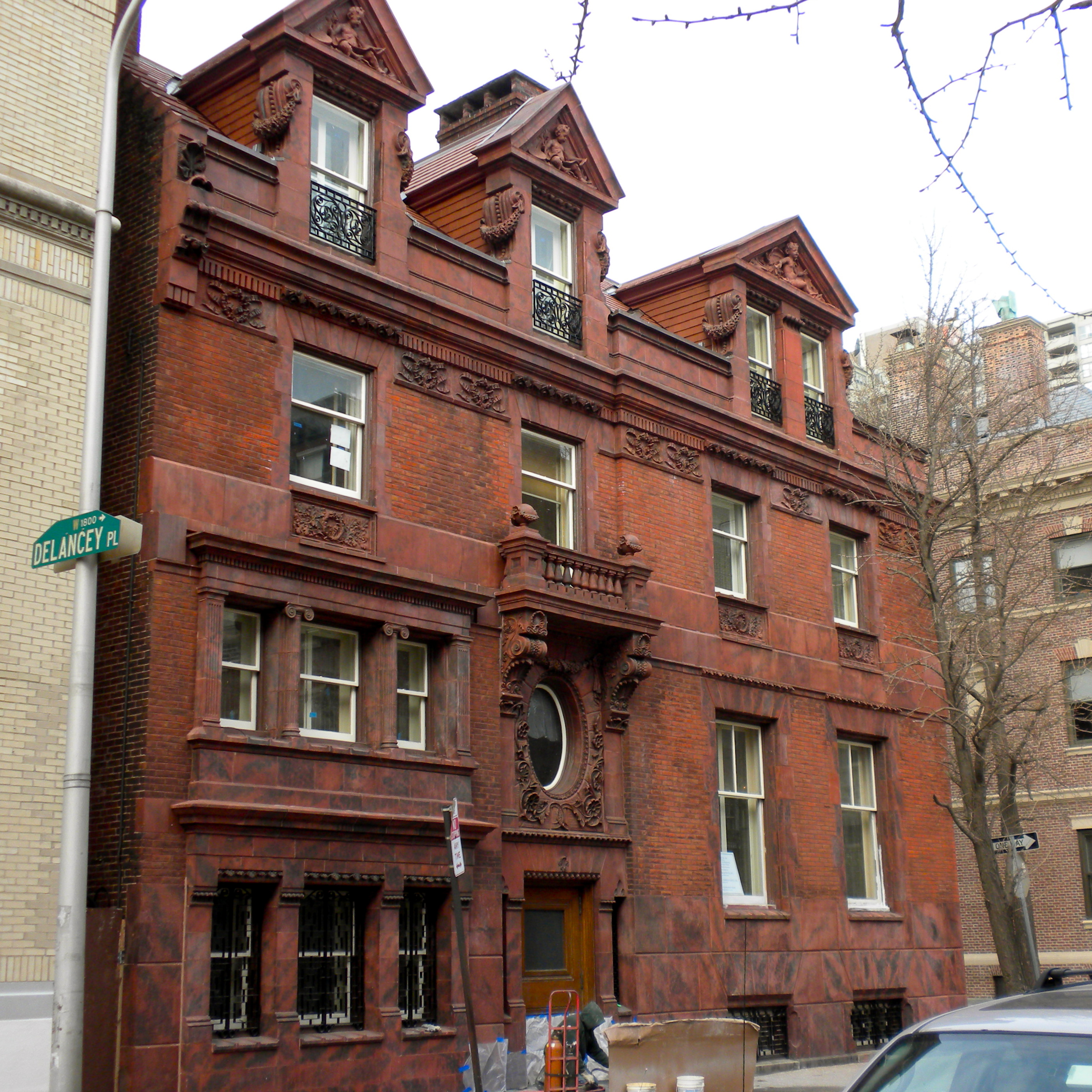
Horace Jayne House (1895), Philadelphia, Pennsylvania, Frank Furness, architect

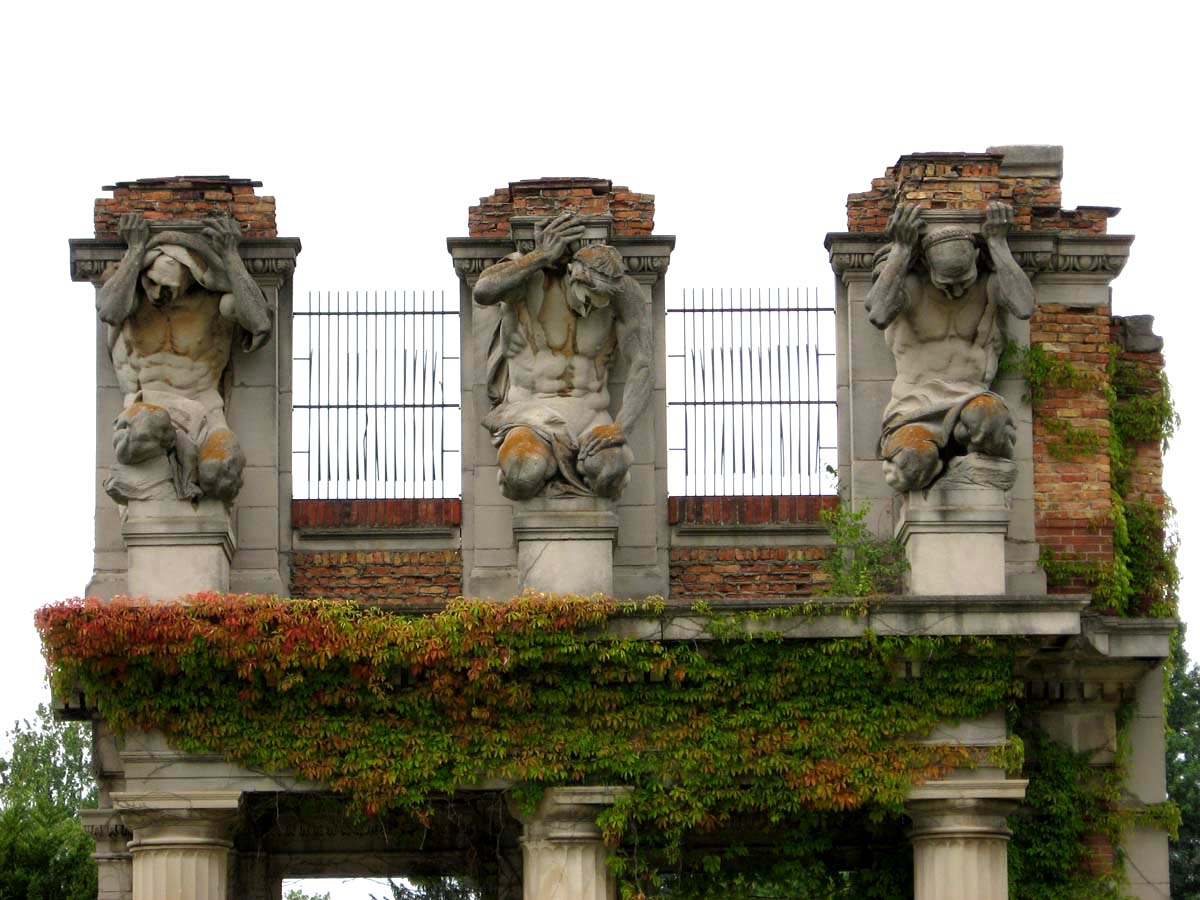
Caryatids from St. Paul Building (1896), Indianapolis

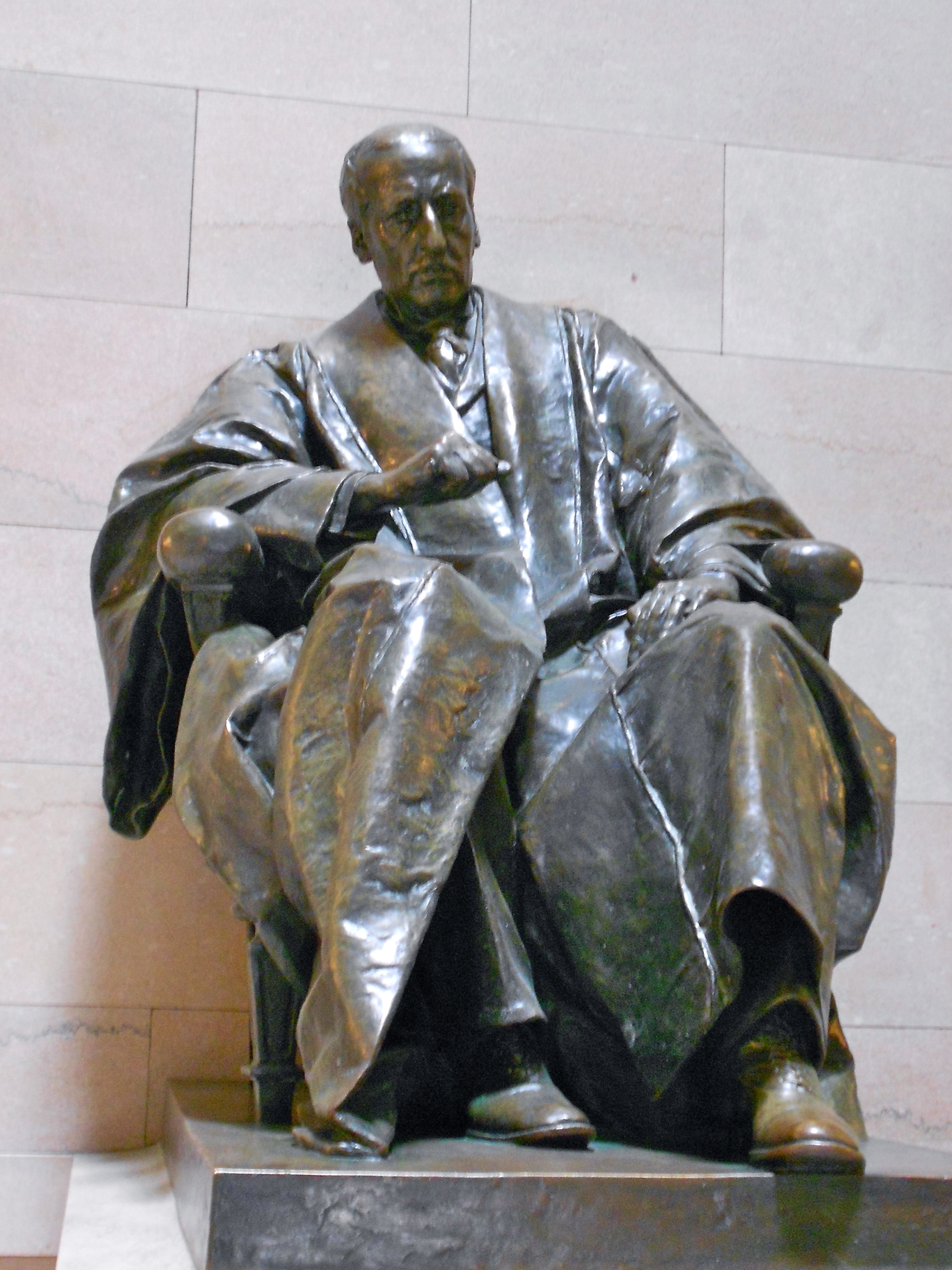
Dr. William Pepper (1899), Free Library of Philadelphia

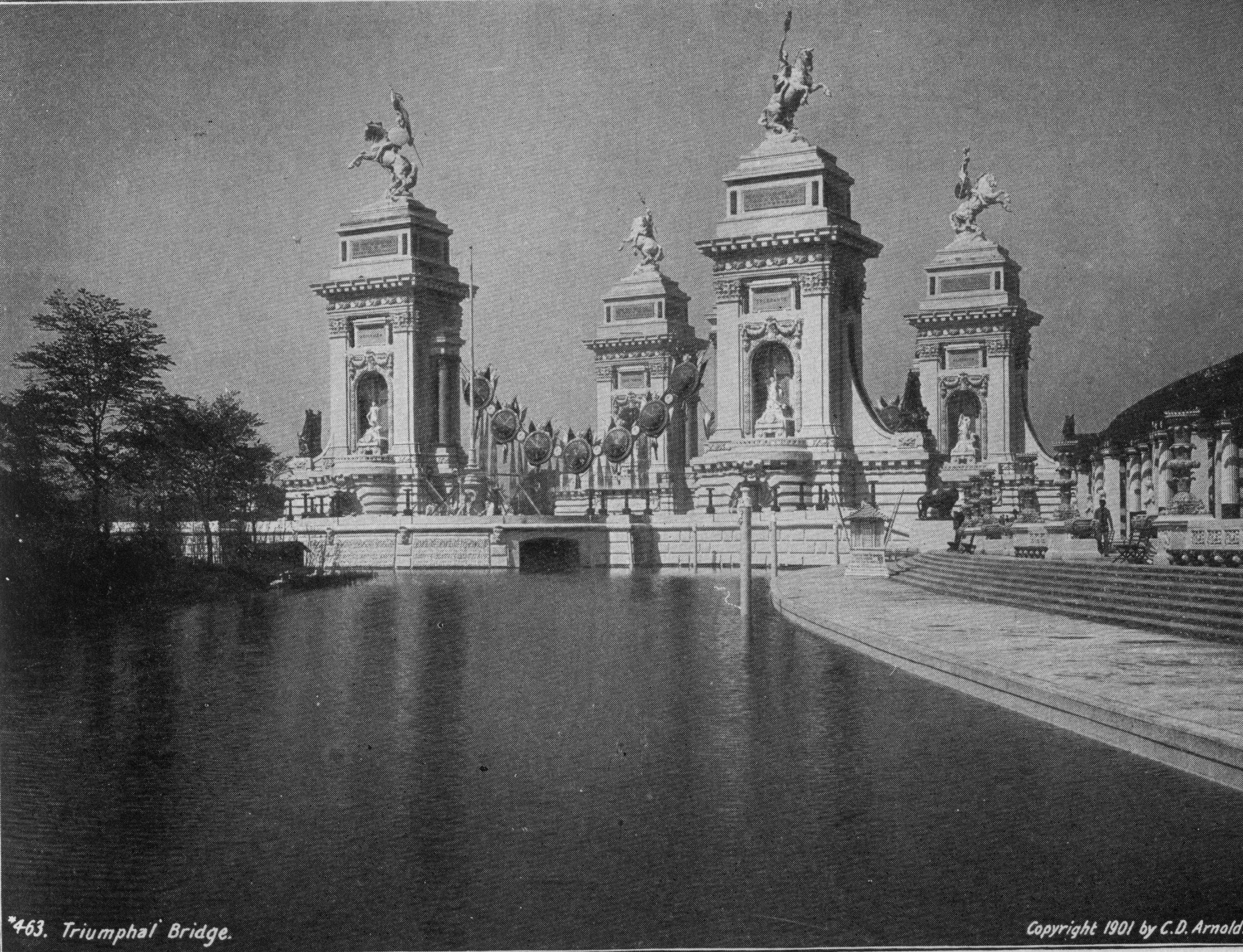
Triumphal Bridge (1901), Pan-American Exposition, Buffalo, New York, John M. Carrere, architect

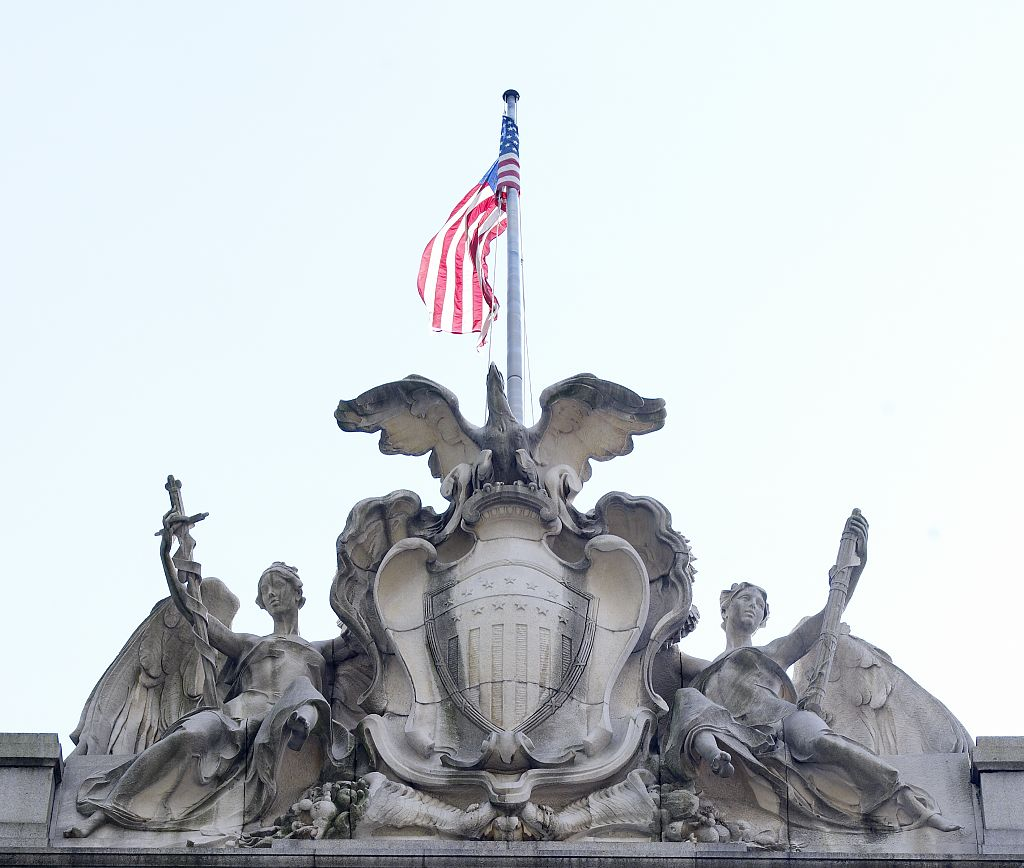
Symbols of Government (1907), Alexander Hamilton U.S. Custom House, New York

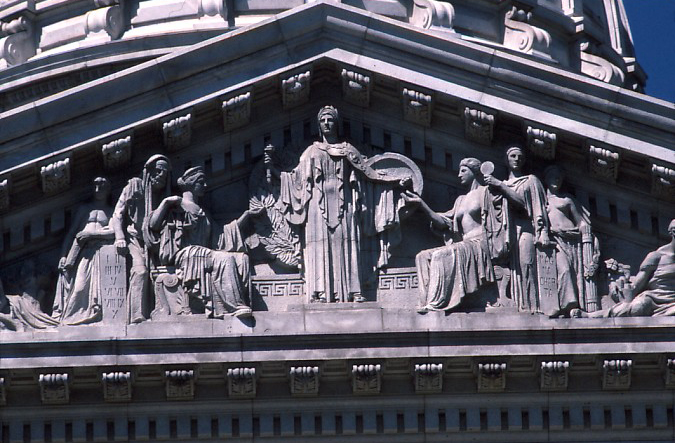
Wisconsin State Capitol (1908–1912), Madison, Wisconsin, George B. Post, architect

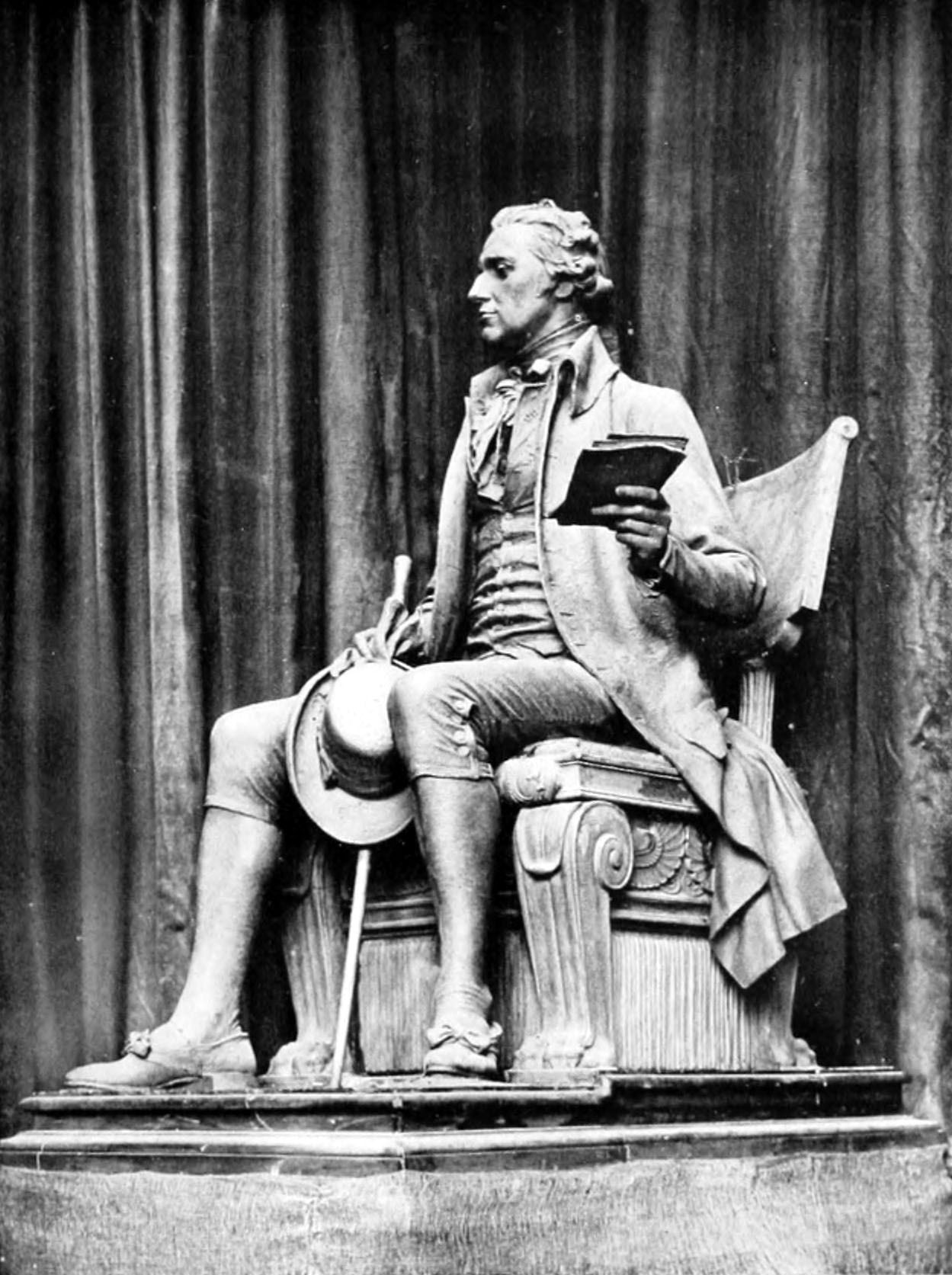
Alexander Hamilton (1909–1911), Cuyahoga County Courthouse, Cleveland, Ohio

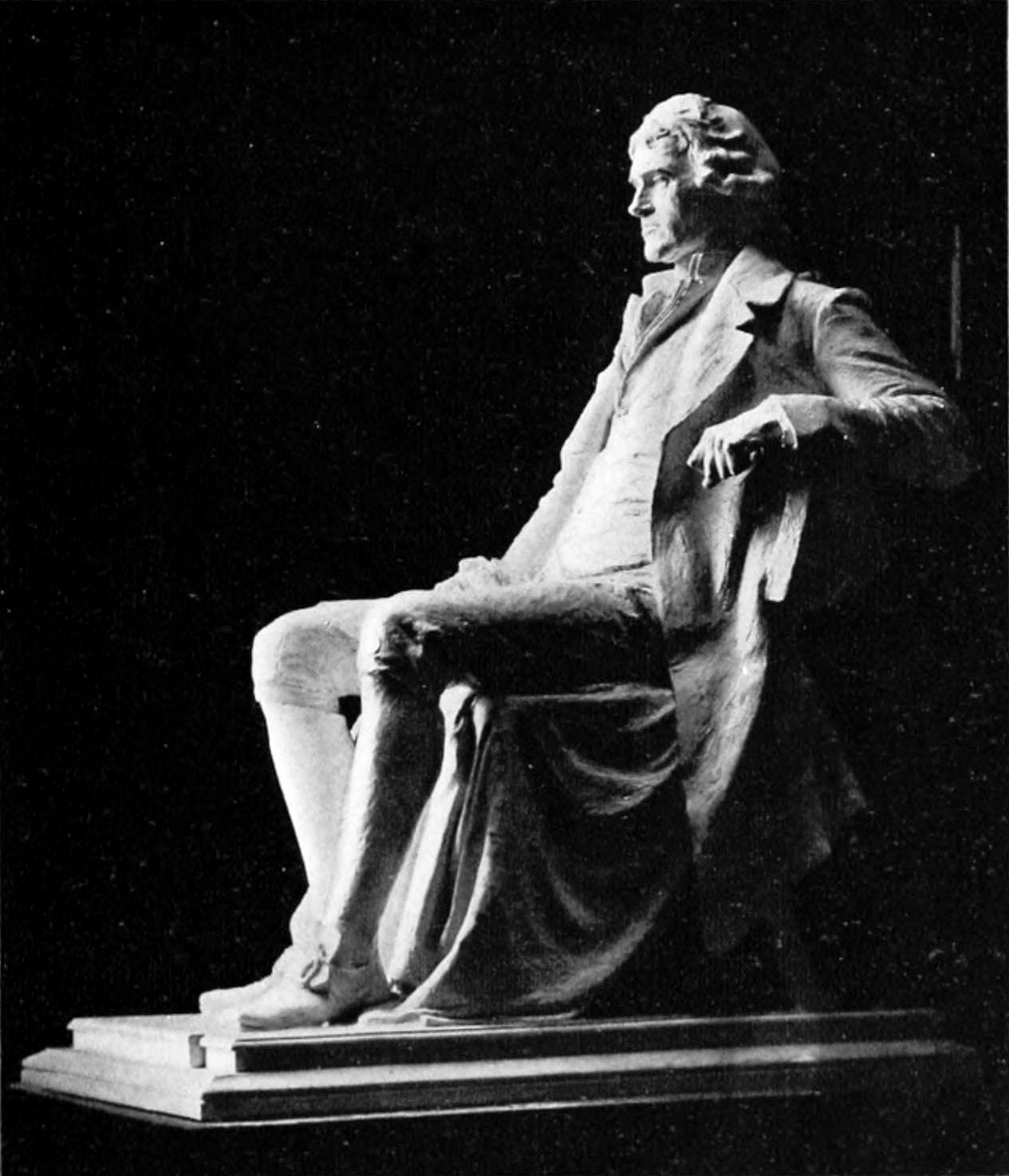
Thomas Jefferson (1909–1911), Cuyahoga County Courthouse, Cleveland, Ohio

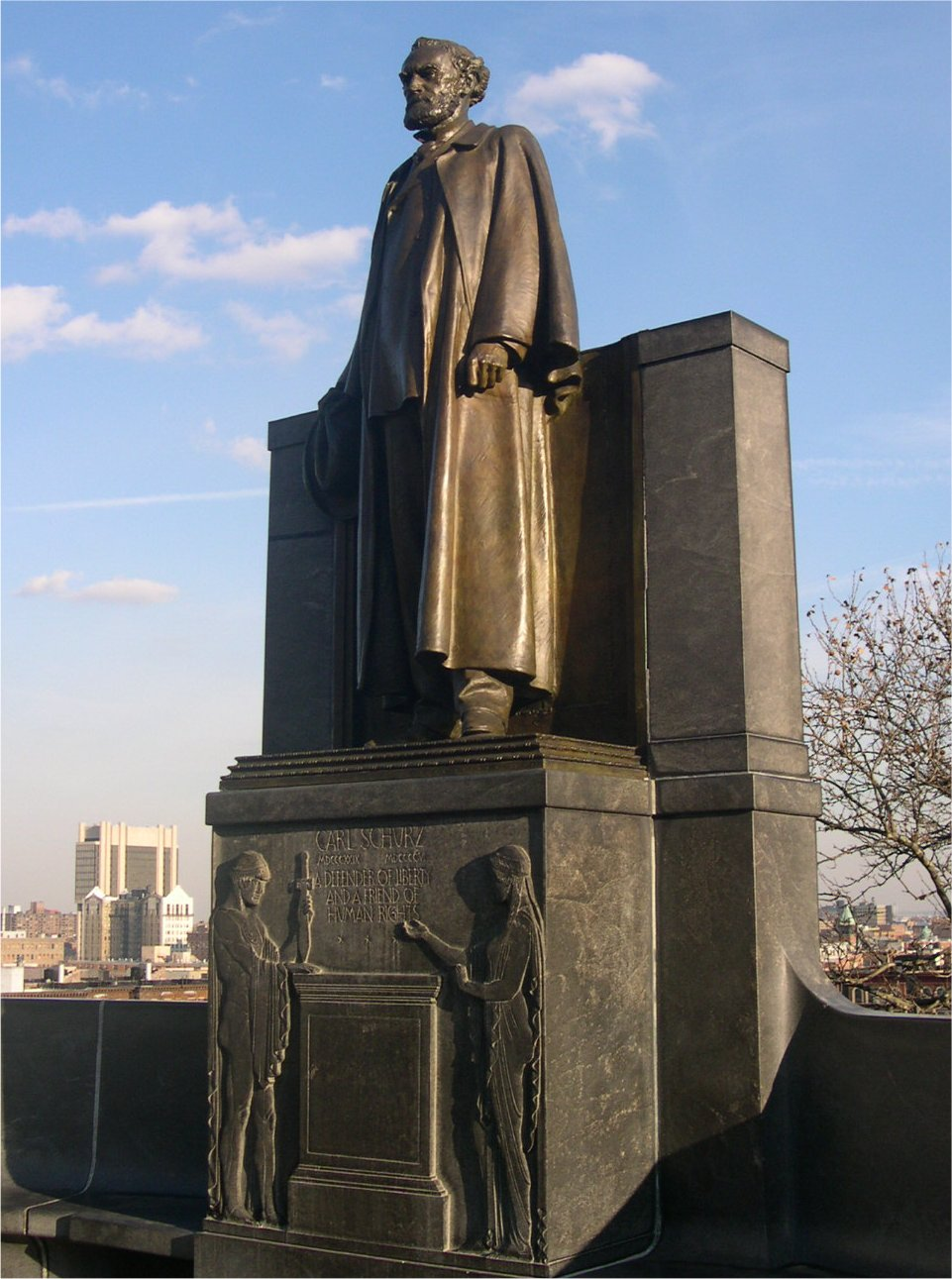
Carl Schurz Monument (1913), Morningside Park, Manhattan

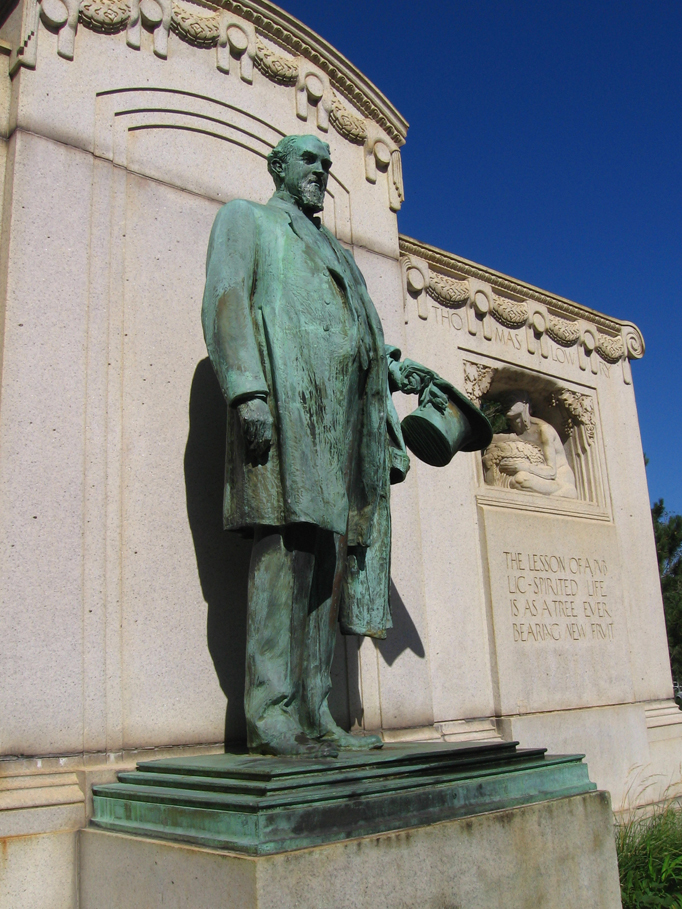
Thomas Lowry Memorial (1915), Minneapolis

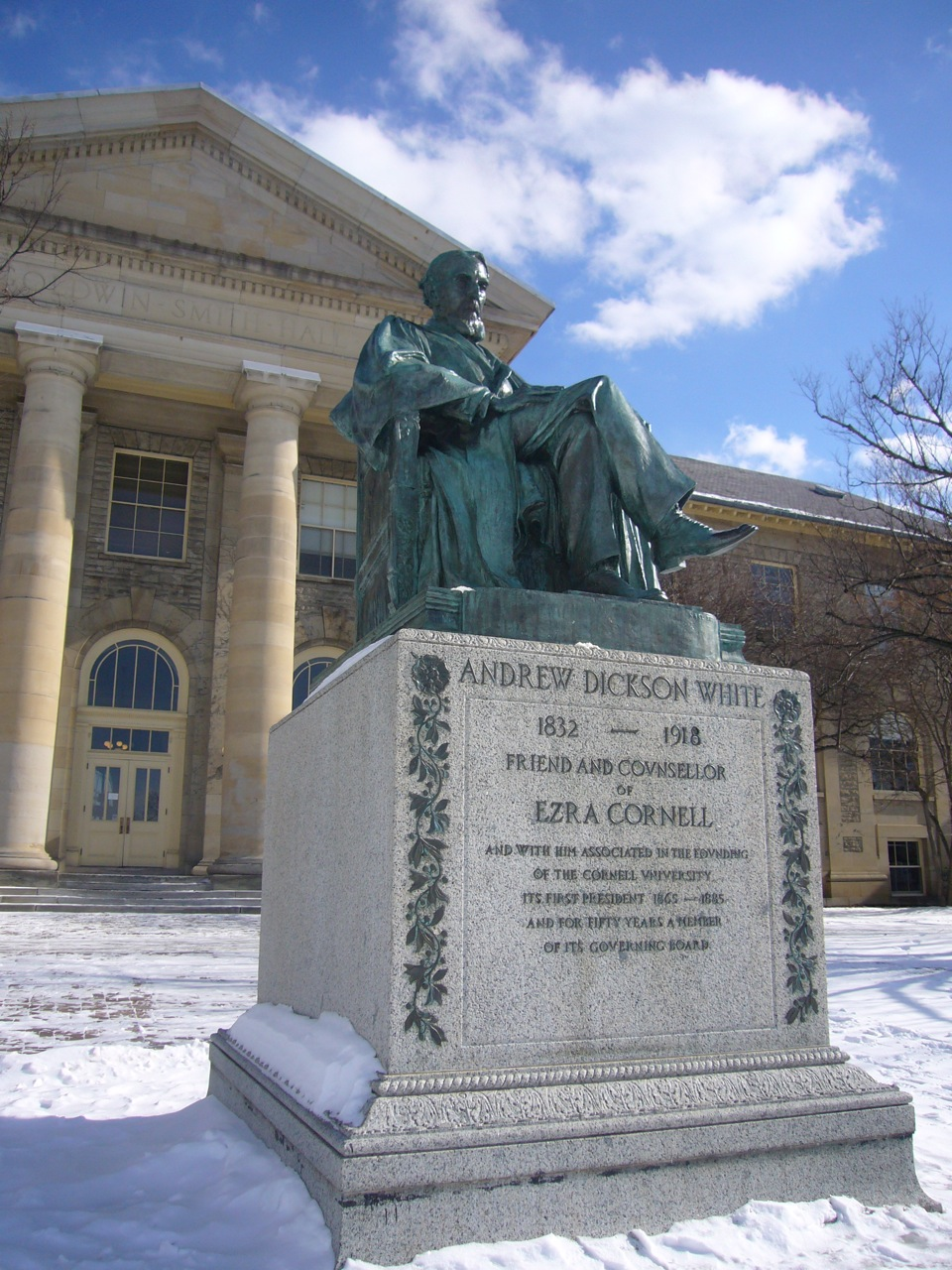
Andrew Dickson White statue (1915), Cornell University, Ithaca, New York
