= List of public art in Baltimore =

List of public artworks in Baltimore, Maryland, U.S.

This list of public art in Baltimore provides an introduction to public art which is accessible in an outdoor public space in Baltimore. Because the collection of public art is extensive and continues to grow, the list is incomplete. The list is alphabetized by name of the artwork or by name of the person who is the subject of the artwork. A fuller picture is available externally at:

- Baltimore City Public Art Inventory as of 2012
- Smithsonian American Art Museum, Art Inventories Catalog – database for Baltimore

== # ==
Image	Title / subject	Location and coordinates	Date	Artist / designer	Type	Material	Dimensions	Designation	Owner / administrator	Notes
	#9	5100 Falls Road	1974	John D. Ferguson		Cor-Ten steel			Administered by Rouse Company	
	#10	5100 Falls Road	1974	John D. Ferguson		Painted steel			Administered by Rouse Company	

== A ==
Image	Title / subject	Location and coordinates	Date	Artist / designer	Type	Material	Dimensions	Designation	Owner / administrator	Notes
	Amanogawa	Phoenix Shot Tower	1977	Robert DuBourg		Black Tennessee marble and stainless steel				
	Angel of Truth	12 West Franklin Street	1960 reproduction of 1818	original Henry Berge, reproduction Antonio Capellano		Terra cotta			First Unitarian Church	
	Arbor	Mount Vernon Children's Park	2005	David Hess		Stainless Steel				
	Aquatic Sea Horses	War Memorial Building	1927	sculptor: Edmond R. Amateis, architect: Laurence Hall Fowler		Limestone				
	The Armistead Monument / George Armistead	Fort McHenry 39°15′51.01″N 76°34′55.80″W	1914	Edward Berge		Bronze	8 ft 4 1/2 in (2.553 m) × 4 ft (1.2 m)		National Park Service	
	Atlantic Blue Roller Column	Russell Street Median across from Oriole Park at Camden Yards	1977	Dominick Cea		Painted steel				

== B ==
Image	Title / subject	Location and coordinates	Date	Artist / designer	Type	Material	Dimensions	Designation	Owner / administrator	Notes
	Baltimore	Phoenix Shot Tower	1977	William Bennett		Black Tennessee marble				
	Baltimore City Fraternal Order of Police Memorial	Phoenix Shot Tower	2002-2003	Ferebe Streett		Bronze				
	Baltimore Federal	Edward A. Garmatz United States Courthouse	1978	George Sugarman		Painted Aluminum			United States General Services Administration	
	Baltimore Passage	Albemarle Square	2007	David Hess		Copper				
	The Battle Monument	Calvert and Fayette Streets 39°17′26.96″N 76°36′44.75″W	1825	Antonio Capellano; Architect: Maximilian Godefroy		Marble	52 ft (16 m) high; figure height 8 ft 6 in (2.59 m)		City of Baltimore	
	BMA Lions	Baltimore Museum of Art	1930	Adolf Weinman		Limestone			Baltimore Museum of Art	
	Boanerges	5001 Moravia Road	1978	Mary Ann Mears		Cor-Ten Steel				
	Simon Bolivar	Bedford Square	1948	Felix G. W. Welden		Bronze				
	Boy and Turtle Fountain	West Square of Mt. Vernon Square	1916	Henri Crenier		Bronze				
	The Boy Scout	701 Wyman Park Drive	1969 casting of 1937 original	R. Tait McKenzie		Bronze				
	Birth of Venus	Hopkins Plaza	1984	Jonathan Silver		Bronze				

== C ==
Image	Title / subject	Location and coordinates	Date	Artist / designer	Type	Material	Dimensions	Designation	Owner / administrator	Notes
	Calvert Street Bridge Lions	Lanvale Park, Lanvale and Mason Streets	1879	Herman D. A. Henning		Limestone				
	Cecilius Calvert Monument / Cecilius Calvert	Clarence J Mitchell Courthouse	1908	Albert Weinert		Bronze				
	Caterpillar	Dallas F. Nicholas Sr. Elementary School	1976	Norman Carlberg		Cor-Ten steel				
	Chorale	Metro West Center	1981	Isaac Witkin		Painted Steel				
	Colossus I	Waxter Center for Senior Citizens	1972	Alfredo Halegua		Cor-Ten steel				
	Columbus Monument / Christopher Columbus	Druid Hill Park, Jones Falls Trail 39°19′09.9″N 76°38′30.8″W	1892	Achille Canessa		Marble	6 ft (1.8 m) × 34 in (860 mm) × 24 in (610 mm)		City of Baltimore	
	Columbus Obelisk / Christopher Columbus	Harford Road & Walther Avenue, Herring Run Park 39°20′10.9″N 76°34′28.3″W	1792			Brick and stucco	44 ft (13 m) × 6 3/4 in (170 mm)		City of Baltimore	Councilman Ryan Dorsey introduce legislation to rename and rededicate the monument as The Police Violence Victims Monument.

== D ==
Image	Title / subject	Location and coordinates	Date	Artist / designer	Type	Material	Dimensions	Designation	Owner / administrator	Notes
	Mayor Thomas D'Alessandro Jr.	1 Charles Center Plaza	1987	Lloyd Lillie		Bronze				
	Dehontshihgwa'es	Lacrosse Museum and National Hall of Fame	1992	Jud Hartmann		Bronze				
	Diamond #II-III	2 Hopkins Plaza	1916	Antoni Milkowski		Cor-Ten Steel				
	Frederick Douglass	1700 East Cold Spring Lane	1956	James E. Lewis		Bronze				

== E ==
Image	Title / subject	Location and coordinates	Date	Artist / designer	Type	Material	Dimensions	Designation	Owner / administrator	Notes
	Easy Landing	601 Light Street	1977	Kenneth Snelson		Stainless Steel	Sculpture: approx. 24 x 72 x 50 ft.; Base: approx. H. 13 ft. x Diam. 24 in. (9,000 lbs.).		City of Baltimore Development Corporation	

== F ==
Image	Title / subject	Location and coordinates	Date	Artist / designer	Type	Material	Dimensions	Designation	Owner / administrator	Notes
	Fallsway Fountain	Guilford Avenue and Biddle Street 39°18′11.95″N 76°36′42.39″W	1915	Hans Schuler; Architect: Theodore Wells Pietsch		Marble	30 ft × 24 ft × 44 ft (9.1 m × 7.3 m × 13.4 m)		City of Baltimore	
	Family of Dolphins	501 East Pratt Street	1991	Leonard Streckfus		Bronze				
	Fan Figure	1 West Pratt Street	1987	Greg Moring		Polished Stainless Steel				
	Firebird	Symphony Center	2005	Rodney Carroll		Bronze, stainless steel, and copper				
	Fire Chariot	John F. Steadman Fire House, South Eutaw and West Lombard Streets	1973	Roger Majorowicz		Bronze				
	Fire Fighter's Memorial	Gay and Lexington Streets	1990	Tylden Streett		Bronze				
	Force	Mount Vernon Place, the Northeast corner of the Washington Monument 39°17′51.54″N 76°36′54.9″W	1885 copy of 1846 originals	Antoine-Louis Barye		Bronze	39 in × 28 in × 32 in (990 mm × 710 mm × 810 mm)		City of Baltimore	
	Forum Fountain	Dunbar Community High School	1975	Stafford Rolph		Concrete	20 x 53.2 x 51.2 ft.; Basin: approx. W 82 ft. x D. 101.3 ft.		City of Baltimore	
	Form in Space and Winged Victory	7300 Moyer Ave	1969	Harry Hilson		Fiberglass resin and steel				

== G ==
Image	Title / subject	Location and coordinates	Date	Artist / designer	Type	Material	Dimensions	Designation	Owner / administrator	Notes
	The Golden Arm / Johnny Unitas	Gate A, M&T Bank Stadium	2002	Frederick Kail		Bronze				

== H ==
Image	Title / subject	Location and coordinates	Date	Artist / designer	Type	Material	Dimensions	Designation	Owner / administrator	Notes
	Chapin A. Harris Monument / Chapin A. Harris	Wyman Park	1922	Edward Berge		Bronze				
	The Hiker	North Lakewood and East Fayette Streets 39.294602°N 76.579387°W	1943	Theo Alice Ruggles Kitson		Bronze			City of Baltimore	
	Statue of Billie Holiday / Billie Holiday	Pennsylvania and W. Lafayette avenues 39°18′04.3″N 76°37′55.3″W	1985	James Earl Reid		Bronze			City of Baltimore	
	John Mifflin Hood Monument / John Mifflin Hood	Preston Gardens	1911	Richard E. Brooks		Bronze			City of Baltimore	
	Johns Hopkins Monument	Charles and 33rd Streets 39°19′41″N 76°37′4.65″W	1935	Hans Schuler; Architect: William Gordon Beecher		Bronze and marble	70 in × 186 in × 53 in (1,800 mm × 4,700 mm × 1,300 mm)		City of Baltimore	
	Host of the Ellipse	Metro West Center	1985	Ronald Bladen		Cor-Ten Steel				
	John Eager Howard	Howard's Park	1985	David L Gerlach		Red brass				
	John Eager Howard Monument	North garden of Mount Vernon Place 39°17′54.25″N 76°36′56.58″W	1904	Emmanuel Fremiet 1824–1910		Bronze	12 ft × 4 1/2 ft × 9 1/2 ft (3.7 m × 1.4 m × 2.9 m)		City of Baltimore	

== K ==
Image	Title / subject	Location and coordinates	Date	Artist / designer	Type	Material	Dimensions	Designation	Owner / administrator	Notes
	Francis Scott Key Monument / Francis Scott Key	Eutaw Place & Lanvale Street 39.30388°N 76.62605°W	1911	Antonin Mercié		Bronze, marble, and granite. Figure of Columbia appears to be gilt.	Overall: approx. H. 40 ft (12 m)		City of Baltimore	
	Francis Scott Key	10 East Mount Vernon Place	1912	Grace Hill Turnbull		Bronze			Mount Vernon Place United Methodist Church	
	King Penguin	561 Light Street	1956	Grace Hill Turnbull		Marble				
	Conradin Kreutzer	Patterson Park	1915	R. P. Golde		Bronze				

== L ==
Image	Title / subject	Location and coordinates	Date	Artist / designer	Type	Material	Dimensions	Designation	Owner / administrator	Notes
	Lady Baltimore	Mount Royal Terrace at Lennox Street	1880	Herman D. A. Henning		Limestone				
	Lafayette Monument / Marquis de Lafayette	South garden of Mount Vernon Place 39°17′49.92″N 76°36′56.3″W	1924	Andrew O'Connor, Jr.		Bronze	16 ft × 8 ft × 16 ft (4.9 m × 2.4 m × 4.9 m)		City of Baltimore	
	Latrobe Monument/ Ferdinand Claiborne Latrobe	Broadway at Baltimore Street 39.29168°N 76.59386°W	1914	Edward Berge and J. Maxwell Miller		Bronze	150 in × 9 in × 83 1/2 in (3,810 mm × 230 mm × 2,120 mm)		City of Baltimore	
	Luther Monument / Martin Luther	31st Street at Hillen Road	1936	Hans Schuler		Bronze				

== M ==
Image	Title / subject	Location and coordinates	Date	Artist / designer	Type	Material	Dimensions	Designation	Owner / administrator	Notes
	Male/Female	Pennsylvania Station	2004	Jonathan Borofsky		Aluminum				
	Thurgood Marshall	Edward A. Garmatz United States Courthouse	1979	Rueben Kramer		Bronze				
	Maryland Line Monument	Mount Royal Plaza 39°18′20.26″N 76°37′7.71″W	1901	Albert L. Van den Berghen; Architect: Hodges and Leach		Bronze	60 ft 6 in (18.44 m) high; sculpture 11 ft (3.4 m) high approx.		City of Baltimore	
	Maya Queen Empowered	1400 Cathedral Street	1989	Lila Katzen		Stainless Steel and bronze				
	Catherine McAuley, Foundress of the Sisters of Mercy, 1831, Catherine McAuley	Mercy Medical Center	2000	Sister Marie Henderson		Bronze				
	Mercury and Commerce	2 North Charles Street	1906	John Evans		Bronze				
	Military Courage	West garden of Mount Vernon Place 39°17′50.95″N 76°37′0.45″W	1885 copy of 1879 original	Paul DuBois		Bronze	70 in × 24 in × 32 in (1,780 mm × 610 mm × 810 mm)		City of Baltimore	

== N ==
Image	Title / subject	Location and coordinates	Date	Artist / designer	Type	Material	Dimensions	Designation	Owner / administrator	Notes
	Naiad	East garden of Mt Vernon Place	1932	Grace Hill Turnbull		Bronze				
	National Katyń Memorial	Katyn Circle at President and Aliceanna Streets	2000	Andrzej Pityński		Bronze				
	Negro Soldier's Monument	War Memorial Plaza	1971	James E. Lewis		Bronze				
	Nut and Bolt	Mount Royal Elementary/Middle School	1982	J. Arthur Benson		Painted steel				

== O ==
Image	Title / subject	Location and coordinates	Date	Artist / designer	Type	Material	Dimensions	Designation	Owner / administrator	Notes
	On the Trail	Clifton Park	1922	Edward Berge		Bronze				
	Order	Mount Vernon Place, the Southeast corner of the Washington Monument 39°17′50.82″N 76°36′54.91″W	1885 copy of 1846 original	Antoine-Louis Barye		Bronze	38 in × 27 in × 33 in (970 mm × 690 mm × 840 mm)		City of Baltimore	
	Orpheus with the Awkward Foot	Fort McHenry 39°15′51″N 76°34′56″W	1922	Charles Henry Niehaus		Bronze and marble	Height: 39 feet (12 m)		National Park Service	

== P ==
Image	Title / subject	Location and coordinates	Date	Artist / designer	Type	Material	Dimensions	Designation	Owner / administrator	Notes
	George Peabody / George Peabody	East garden of Mount Vernon Place 39°17′51.2″N 76°36′54.14″W	1890 copy of 1869 original	William Wetmore Story		Bronze	84 in × 40 in × 64 in (2,100 mm × 1,000 mm × 1,600 mm)		City of Baltimore	
	Peace	Mount Vernon Place, the Southwest corner of the Washington Monument 39°17′50.66″N 76°36′57.81″W	late 1850s	Antoine-Louis Barye		Bronze	38 in × 26 in × 34 in (970 mm × 660 mm × 860 mm)		City of Baltimore	
	Pearlstone Park	Cathedral and Preston Streets	1985	Scott Burton		Sandblasted concrete and brick				
	Edgar Allan Poe Monument / Edgar Allen Poe	University of Baltimore Law Center Plaza 39°18′20.48″N 76°37′2.27″W	1916	Moses Jacob Ezekiel		Bronze	5 ft (1.5 m) × 27 in (690 mm) × 45 in (1,100 mm)		City of Baltimore	
	Pulaski Memorial	Patterson Park at Linwood and Eastern Avenue 39°17′13.77″N 76°34′37.47″W	1942	Hans Schuler Architect: A. C. Radziszewski		Bronze, marble and brick	129 in (3,300 mm) × 15 ft (4.6 m) × 26 in (660 mm)		City of Baltimore	

== R ==
Image	Title / subject	Location and coordinates	Date	Artist / designer	Type	Material	Dimensions	Designation	Owner / administrator	Notes
	Recreation and Education	McCulloh Homes	1940	Henry Berge		Concrete				
	Red Buoyant	100 East Pratt Street	1978	Mary Ann Mears		Painted Aluminum				
	RedwoodArch	West Redwood Street between South Eutaw and South Paca Streets	1988	Linda DePalma		Painted Steel				
	Lizette Woodworth Reese Monument	1101 East 33rd Street	1939	Grace Hill Turnbull		Marble				
	Rogers Avenue	Rogers Avenue Metro Station	1983	Greg Moring		Cor-Ten Steel				
	Babe's Dream / Babe Ruth	Oriole Park at Camden Yards 39°17′5.81″N 76°37′14.56″W	1998	Susan Luery		Bronze	16 ft (4.9 m) high		Maryland Stadium Authority	

== S ==
Image	Title / subject	Location and coordinates	Date	Artist / designer	Type	Material	Dimensions	Designation	Owner / administrator	Notes
	Samurai Rocker	Margaret Brent Elementary School	1979	Richard D. Gottlieb		Cor-Ten Steel				
	Sea Urchin	Mount Vernon Place, the South garden of Mt. Vernon Place	1959 copy of 1922 original	Edward Berge		Bronze				
	Seated Lion	Mount Vernon Place, the Southwest corner of the Washington Monument 39°17′51.04″N 76°36′58.28″W	1885 copy of 1846 original	Antoine-Louis Barye		Bronze	75 in × 38 in × 53 in (1,900 mm × 970 mm × 1,350 mm)		City of Baltimore	
	Serviceman's Memorial	Belair Road and Shannon Drive	1921	Edward Berge		Bronze				
	Major General Samuel Smith Monument / Samuel Smith	Federal Hill	1917	Hans Schuler		Bronze				
	Star-Spangled Banner Centennial Monument	Patterson Park near the Observatory	1914	J. Maxwell Miller		Bronze				
	Subvator	Spring Garden Business Park	1989	Rodney Carroll		Aluminum, steel, concrete, gravel, and found objects				

== T ==
Image	Title / subject	Location and coordinates	Date	Artist / designer	Type	Material	Dimensions	Designation	Owner / administrator	Notes
	Triaxial Link	401 Light Street	2004	William J. Niebauer		Concrete				
	To the Glory of Maryland	Fifth Regiment Armory	1923	Hans Schuler		Bronze				

== U ==
Image	Title / subject	Location and coordinates	Date	Artist / designer	Type	Material	Dimensions	Designation	Owner / administrator	Notes
	Union Soldiers and Sailors Monument	Wyman Park, Charles and 29th streets 39°19′25.77″N 76°37′4.30″W	1909	Adolph A. Weinman; Architect: Albert Randolph Ross		Bronze	10 in × 102 in × 150 in (250 mm × 2,590 mm × 3,810 mm)		City of Baltimore	
	Under Sky/One Family	401 East Pratt Street	1980	Mark di Suvero		Steel				
	Untitled	Digital Harbor High School	1978	David von Schlegell		Painted aluminum				
	Untitled	Francis Scott Key Elementary School	1988	John D. McCarty		Painted steel				
	Untitled	Greenmount School	1978	Judith Chodak Goldberg		Ceramic tiles				
	Untitled Crab	Federal Hill Elementary School	1972	Edmund Whiting		Copper				

== V ==
Image	Title / subject	Location and coordinates	Date	Artist / designer	Type	Material	Dimensions	Designation	Owner / administrator	Notes

== W ==
Image	Title / subject	Location and coordinates	Date	Artist / designer	Type	Material	Dimensions	Designation	Owner / administrator	Notes
	Wallace Monument / William Wallace	Druid Hill Park, Lake Drive 39.3173°N 76.6413°W	1893	D. W. Stevenson		Bronze	16 ft × 6 ft × 4 ft (4.9 m × 1.8 m × 1.2 m); Base 14 ft × 12 ft × 11 ft (4.3 m × 3.7 m × 3.4 m)		City of Baltimore	
	Severn Teackle Wallis / Severn Teackle Wallis	East garden of Mount Vernon Place 39°17′51.33″N 76°36′51.29″W	1904	Laurent-Honoré Marqueste		Bronze	94 in × 40 in × 30 in (2,390 mm × 1,020 mm × 760 mm)		City of Baltimore	
	William T. Walters	Walters Art Museum, Charles Street Enterence	1907 copy of 1867 original	William Henry Rinehart		Bronze				
	War	Mount Vernon Place, the Northwest corner of the Washington Monument 39°17′51.44″N 76°36′57.87″W	1885 copies of 1846 originals	Antoine-Louis Barye		Bronze	40 in × 28 in × 36 in (1,020 mm × 710 mm × 910 mm)		City of Baltimore	
	Washington Monument	Mount Vernon Place 39°17′51″N 76°36′56″W	1829	Enrico Causici; Architect: Robert Mills		Cockeysville Marble	188 ft (57 m) high, sculpture 16 ft (4.9 m) high approx.		City of Baltimore	
	George Washington	Druid Hill Park 39.3175°N 76.6428°W	1857	Edward Sheffield Bartholomew		Marble	8 in × 3 in × 30 in (203 mm × 76 mm × 762 mm)		City of Baltimore	
	Lieutenant Colonel William H. Watson Monument / William H. Watson	Mount Royal Terrace at North Avenue	1902	Sculptor: Edward Berge architect: Hodges and Leach		Bronze				
	Winged Youth	Montebello Elementary School	1999	Rodney Carroll		Bronze, aluminum, and Cor-Ten steel				
	World War I Memorial	Baltimore City College High School	1920	J. Maxwell Miller		Bronze				

== Z ==
Image	Title / subject	Location and coordinates	Date	Artist / designer	Type	Material	Dimensions	Designation	Owner / administrator	Notes
	Frank Zappa Bust / Frank Zappa	Eastern Avenue & Conkling Street Enoch Pratt Free Library 39.286512°N 76.566959°W	2008	Konstantinas Bogdanas		Bronze and steel.	Overall: approx. H. 15 ft (4.6 m)		City of Baltimore	Gift of Lithuania; the bust is a reproduction of one located in Vilnius, Lithuania.

== Art Re-sited Indoors ==
subject	image	artist	date	date moved	location	current location	coordinates	material	dimensions	owner
The Thinker		Auguste Rodin	1930	1971	Exterior Baltimore Museum of Art	Interior Baltimore Museum of Art		Bronze		

== Vanished Artwork ==
Image	Title / subject	Location and coordinates	Date	Artist / designer	Type	Material	Dimensions	Designation	Owner / administrator	Notes
	#31	Harriet Tubman Elementary School	1976	Andrew Mezensky		Found objects				
	Boy Releasing a Bird	Carrie Murray Outdoor Education Center	1989	William F. Duffy		Painted steel				
	Brio	Fort Worthington Recreation Center	1979	Mary Ann Mears		Painted steel				
	Citisphere	Baltimore City College	1979	Robert Fergerson		Stainless steel				
	The Course of Culture Horse	Govans Elementary School	1980	Stan Edmister		Painted steel				
	The Guide	Baltimore City College	1980	Ayokunle Odeleye		Galvanized steel				
	Lady Madonna with Child	David E. Weglein Elementary School	1976	Stan Edmister						
	The Quest	Canton Junior High	1969	Lisa Kaslow		Fiberglass resin and steel				
	Sea Birds	Calvin Rodwell Elementary Middle School	1976	Norman Therrien						
	Untitled	Cecil Elementary School	1968	Pierre duFayet		Stainless steel and resin				
	Untitled	Woodholme Elementary School	1969	Harry Hilson		Fiberglass resin and steel				
	The Wishbone House	Warwick and Baltimore Streets	1967	Colin Greenly		Concrete				

== Disestablished Artwork ==
Image	Title / subject	Location and coordinates	Date	Artist / designer	Type	Material	Dimensions	Designation	Owner / administrator	Notes
	Christopher Columbus / Christopher Columbus	Little Italy, Columbus Piazza	1984	Mauro Bigarani		Marble	14 ft (4.3 m)		City of Baltimore	Destroyed on July 4, 2020, by protesters toppling over the statue and dumping the remains into the Baltimore Harbor.
	Confederate Soldiers and Sailors Monument	Mount Royal Avenue and Lafayette Avenue	1902–2017	Frederick Ruckstull		Bronze			City of Baltimore	Removed August 16, 2017, per joint resolution of the City Council and approval from the Mayor, following a murder in Charlottesville, VA in partial agreement with recommendations of a Joint Commission report (2016).
	Confederate Women's Monument	Charles Street and University Parkway 39°19′59.94″N 76°37′6.11″W	1917–2017	J. Maxwell Miller		Bronze	115 in × 114 in × 98 in (2,920 mm × 2,900 mm × 2,490 mm)		City of Baltimore	Removed August 16, 2017, per joint resolution of the City Council and approval from the Mayor, following a murder in Charlottesville, VA in partial agreement with recommendations of a Joint Commission report (2016).
	Jackson and Lee Monument	West slope of Wyman Park Dell along Art Museum Drive	1948–2017	Laura Gardin Fraser		Bronze			City of Baltimore	Removed August 16, 2017, per joint resolution of the City Council and approval from the Mayor, following a murder in Charlottesville, VA in partial agreement with recommendations of a Joint Commission report (2016).
	Roger B. Taney	North garden of Mount Vernon Place 39°17′52.63″N 76°36′56.47″W	1871, 1887 recast, 2017 removed	William Henry Rinehart		Bronze	86 in × 47 in × 62 in (2,200 mm × 1,200 mm × 1,600 mm)		City of Baltimore	Removed August 16, 2017, per joint resolution of the City Council and approval from the Mayor, following a murder in Charlottesville, VA in partial agreement with recommendations of a Joint Commission report (2016).
