= Bust of Christopher Columbus =

Bust of Christopher Columbus may refer to:

- Bust of Christopher Columbus (Detroit), Michigan, U.S.
- Bust of Christopher Columbus (Lancaster, Pennsylvania), U.S.

== See also ==
- Statue of Christopher Columbus (disambiguation)
- Columbus Fountain
- Columbus Monument (disambiguation)
- List of monuments and memorials to Christopher Columbus
- Monument to Christopher Columbus (disambiguation)
