= Armistead Monument =

Monument in Baltimore, Maryland, U.S.

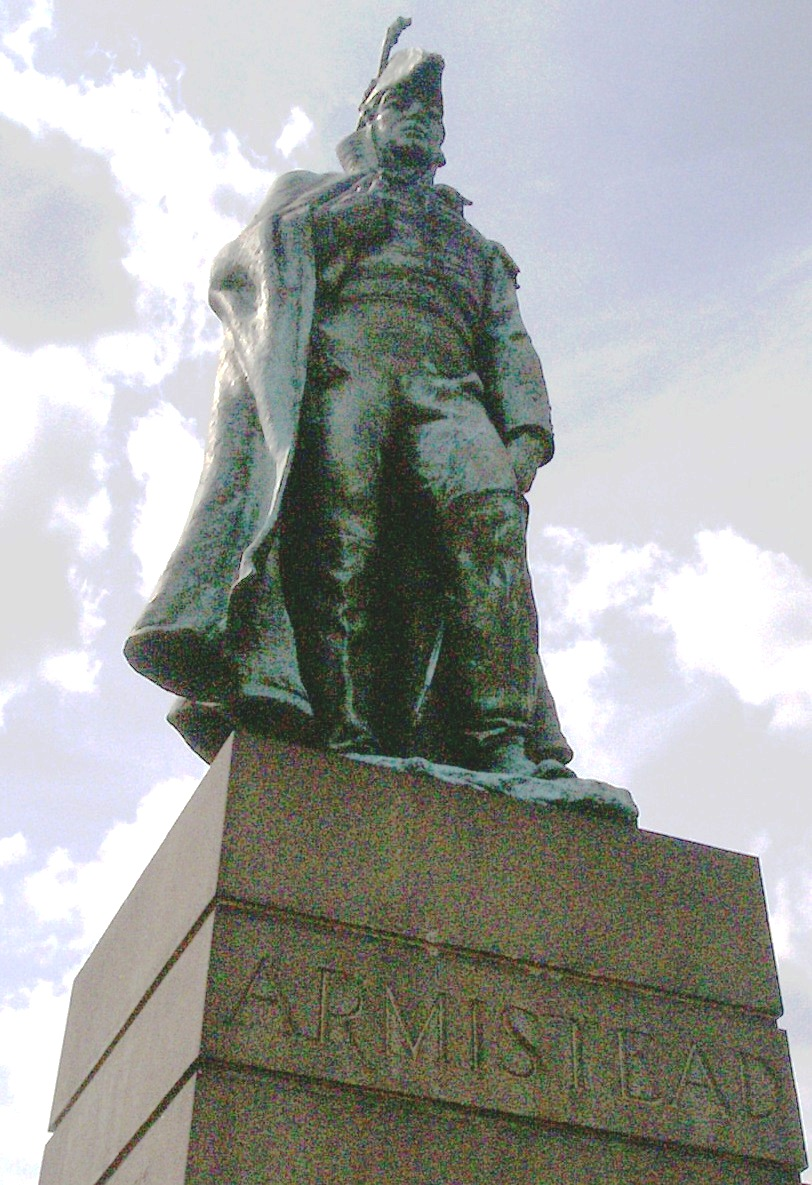
- George Armistead at Fort McHenry
- Artist: Edward Berge
- Year: 1914
- Medium: Bronze
- Dimensions: 240 cm × 140 cm × 120 cm (96 in × 54 in × 48 in)
- Location: Baltimore, Maryland; 39°15′51.01″N 76°34′55.80″W
- Owner: National Park Service

The Armistead Monument is a bronze statue of Col. George Armistead, by Edward Berge. It is located at Fort McHenry, Baltimore. It was dedicated on September 12, 1914.

The inscription reads:
(Sculpture, rear of bronze base, proper right:)
CAST BY ROMAN BRONZE WORKS NY
(Sculpture, rear of bronze base, proper left:)
BERGE
(Base, front:)

ARMISTEAD

(Base, left side:)

ERECTED SEPT. 12, 1914

BY THE CITY OF BALTIMORE
SOC. WAR OF 1812 CONTRIBUTING
IN COMMEMORATION OF THE GALLANT
DEFENSE OF FORT McHENRY
UNDER THE COMMAND OF
COL. GEORGE ARMISTEAD
WHICH WAS THE INSPIRATION
OF THE
NATIONAL ANTHEM

THE STAR SPANGLED BANNER

(Base, right side:)

TO

COL. GEORGE ARMISTEAD
APRIL 10 1779 APRIL 25 1818
COMMANDER OF THIS FORT
DURING THE BOMBARDMENT
BY THE BRITISH FLEET

SEPT. 13-14 WAR OF 1812

(Base, rear: list of names of the commission)
signed founder's mark appears.

== See also ==
- List of public art in Baltimore
- Fort McHenry
