= Columbus Monument (Canessa) =

Monument to Christopher Columbus in Baltimore, Maryland, U.S.

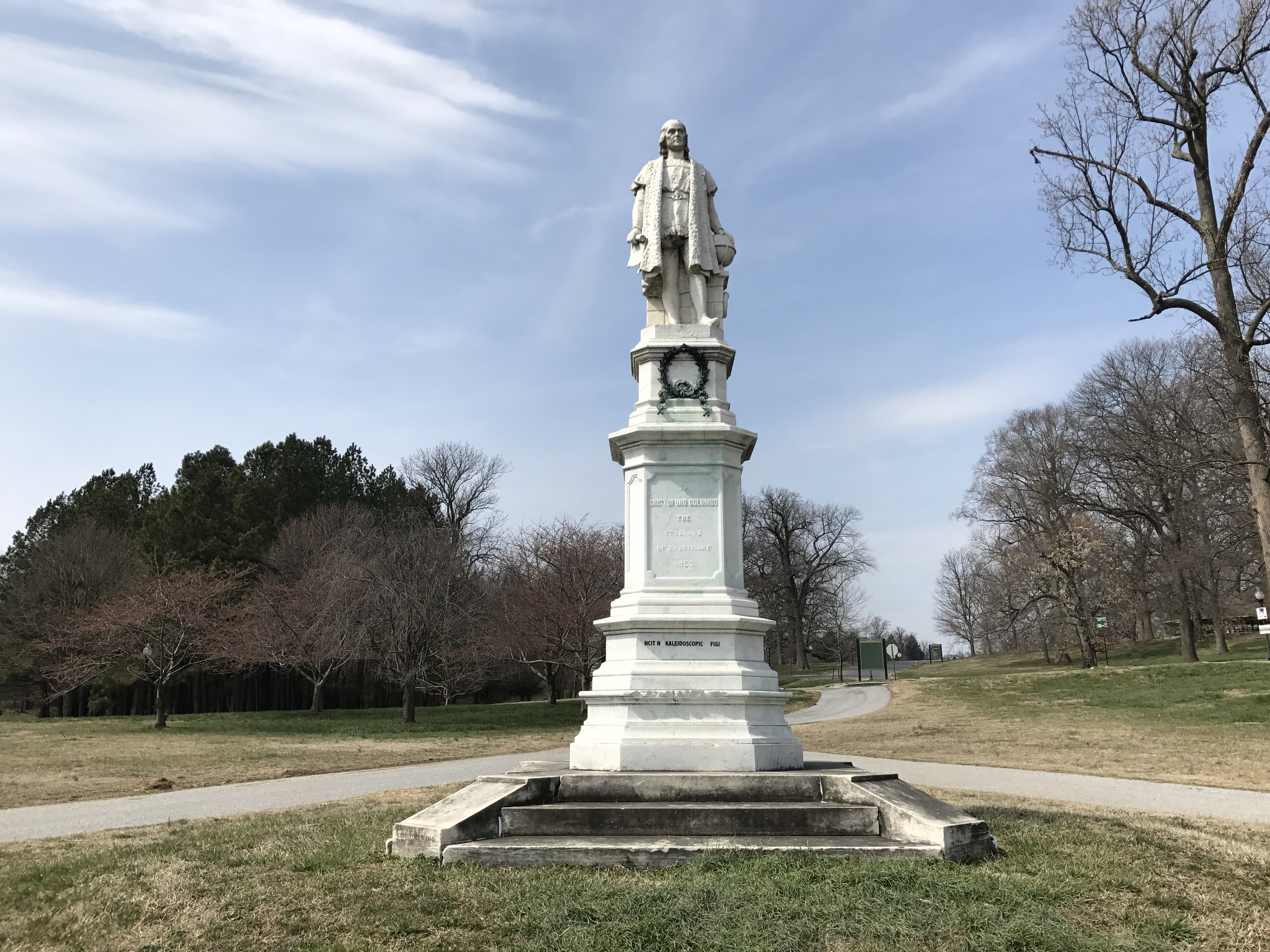
- Sculpture in 2012
- Artist: Achille Canessa
- Year: 1892
- Location: Baltimore, Maryland, U.S.
- Owner: City of Baltimore

The Columbus Monument is one of three monuments to Christopher Columbus in Baltimore, Maryland. Erected in 1892 in Druid Hill Park, the sculpture is known to be the second oldest monument in Baltimore towards the Italian explorer, the first being the Columbus Obelisk in northeast Baltimore.

== History ==
The Columbus Monument is dedicated to the Italians of Baltimore as indicated on its inscription.

In June 2020, the group known as the Baltimore BLOC threatened to destroy the monument by offering Mayor Young a dilemma of either removing all Columbus memorials or face vandalism as a consequence. The statue of Christopher Columbus in Little Italy was destroyed by protesters on July 4, 2020, prompting questions surrounding the future of the historic monument.

== See also ==
- List of public art in Baltimore
- List of monuments and memorials to Christopher Columbus
- Monument and memorial controversies in the United States
