= Jonathan Silver (disambiguation) =

Jonathan Silver (1949–1997) was an entrepreneur from Bradford, Yorkshire.

Jonathan Silver may also refer to:

- Jonathan Silver (sculptor) (1937–1992), American figurative sculptor
- John Silver (musician) (born 1950), drummer for Genesis
