= Mary Fowler (disambiguation) =

Mary Fowler (born 2003) is an Australian soccer player.

Mary Fowler may also refer to:

- Mary Fowler (geophysicist) (born 1950), British geologist and academic
- Mary Blackford Fowler (1892–1982), American painter and sculptor
