= George Washington (Bartholomew) =

Statue in Baltimore, Maryland, U.S.

- Washington Monument
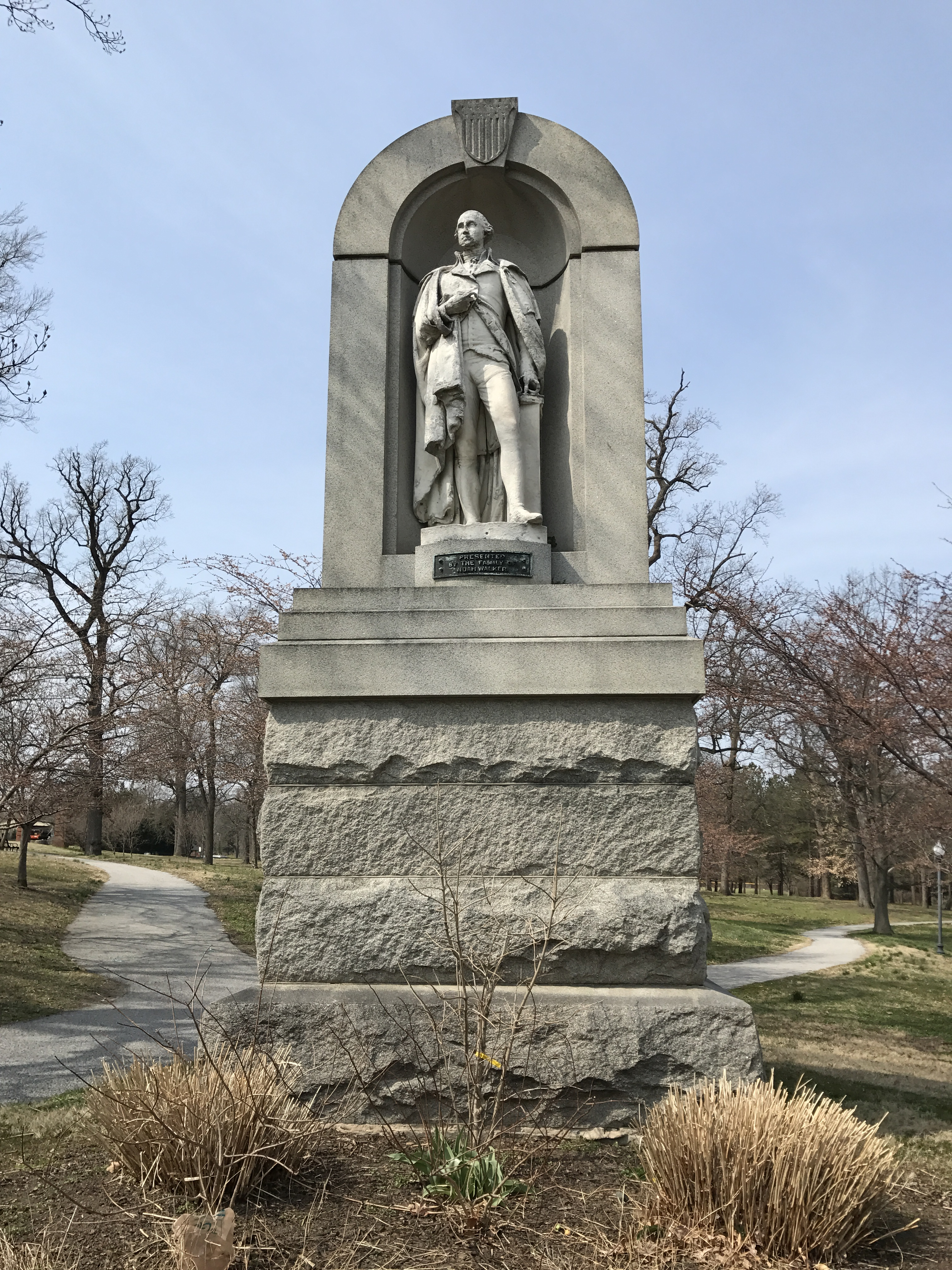
- Sculpture in 2017
- Artist: Edward Sheffield Bartholomew
- Year: 1857
- Location: Baltimore, Maryland, U.S.
- Owner: City of Baltimore

George Washington is a statue of the first president of the United States by the same name located in Baltimore, Maryland. Erected in 1857 in, the sculpture is located at the main entrance of Druid Hill Park.

== History ==
Created by famed sculptor Edward Sheffield Bartholomew in 1858, the George Washington statue was relocated to Druid Hill Park in 1885. It was moved from old Carroll Hall building at the southwest corner of Calvert and Baltimore Streets.

In June 2020, the historic statue was defaced with red paint and vandalized with graffiti in response to the murder of George Floyd.

== See also ==
- Cultural depictions of George Washington
- List of public art in Baltimore
- List of statues of George Washington
- List of sculptures of presidents of the United States
