= Harold North Fowler =

American classicist (1859–1955)

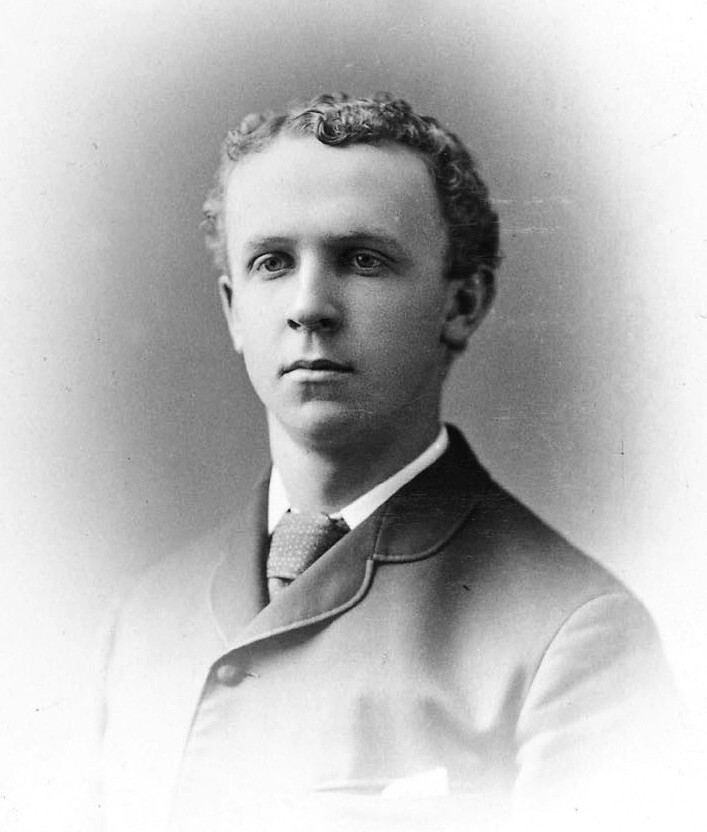
Fowler in 1880

Harold North Fowler (February 25, 1859 - September 29, 1955) was an American classicist and archaeologist.

He was the original translator of a number of Plato's works for the Loeb Classical Library collection. Fowler also translated Plutarch for the Loeb series and edited a number of school books.

He was also known for his studies of the diolkos, the means of transporting ships between the Gulf of Corinth and the Saronic Gulf. He was the first student enrolled at the American School at Athens, to which he often returned. He chaired the School's publications committee and wrote and revised the reports on Erectheum. As editor-in-chief of the Corinth publications, he helped resolve the long dispute about the location of the diolkos, showing that it began south of the western mouth of the Gulf of Corinth. Later excavations by the Greek Ministry of National Education supported his findings.

He was married to Mary Blackford Fowler.
