= Marilyn Rinehart =

Marilyn Jeanette Plank Rinehart (30 September 1926 - 13 March 2012) was an American organist who composed and arranged works for chorus and organ.

Rinehart’s parents were Martha Rudy and Raymond Plank. She married Carroll Rinehart in 1948 and they had two daughters and one son. She graduated from Ashland College, and later studied at the University of Arizona. Rinehart belonged to the American Guild of Organists and served as a church organist at First United Methodist Church and at Catalina United Methodist Church, both in Tucson, Arizona.

Rinehart’s works, both original compositions and arrangements, were published by Canyon Press, Hall & McCreary (a division of Schmitt Publications), Shawnee Press, and Unity Music Press. They included:

== Works ==
=== Organ works ===
- Christmas Medley
- Precious Lord, Take My Hand
- Spirituals and More

=== Vocal works ===
- A God of Love (chorus)
- Little Jesus Came to Town (chorus; text by Lizette Wordworth Reese)
- Mary Sings (chorus)
- O Thou Who Cometh from Above (chorus)
