= Mildred Souers =

American composer

- Born: Mildred Elizabeth Thomson Souers; Des Moines, Iowa
- Citizenship: American
- Education: Drake University
- Partner: Marshall Ankeny Souers
- Children: 1

Mildred Elizabeth Thomson Souers (February 26, 1894 - August 1977) was an American composer who wrote music for ballets and ballet studios, as well as for chamber ensembles, piano, and voice.

Souers was born in Des Moines, Iowa, to Addie F. and Ogilvie Sinclair Thomson. She married Marshall Ankeny Souers in 1918 and they had one son.

Souers attended Drake University, where she studied with Francis J. Pyle. Later, she studied with Marion Bauer in New York. During World War I, she worked as a studio accompanist for Grace Jones Jackson, and volunteered as a weekly entertainer on Red Cross programs. She was an announcer for Iowa radio stations KSO and KRNT.

Souers belonged to the American Society of Composers, Authors, and Publishers (ASCAP), the music sorority Sigma Alpha Iota, and the First Church of Christ, Scientist. She was a board member of the Des Moines Symphony Orchestra. One of her choral compositions won First Prize from the National Federation of Music Clubs. The Iowa Federation of Music Clubs honored her as their Composer of the Year in 1962.

Souers’ papers are archived at the State Historical Society of Iowa in the Annals of Iowa. Her compositions were recorded commercially by Hoctor Records, a sub-label of Dance Records, Inc. Souers’ music is published by Carl Fischer Inc., Hal Leonard, and Willis Music Co. Her compositions include:

== Ballet ==
- Ballet of the Enchanted Dolls (piano, flute and voice; with Betty Bird and Titiana Grantzeva)
- Barre and Technique Melodies for the Dance Studio
- Dance of the Field Mice

== Piano ==
- Dance Suite
- Impromptu
- Toccata Breve
- Under the Greenwood Tree

== Vocal ==
- “April Weather” (text by Lizette Woodworth Reese)
- “Christmas Folk Song”
- “Feed My Sheep” (text by Mary Baker Eddy)
- “Immortal”
- “Iowa, Beautiful Land”
- “What Christmas Means to Me”
- Winter Nocturne (for chorus)
- Hear Impromptu by Mildred Souers
- Hear Ballet Of The Enchanted Dolls by Mildred Thompson Souers, Betty Bird, and Tatiana Grantzeva
