= Lafayette Monument =

Monument by Andrew O'Connor in Baltimore, Maryland, U.S.

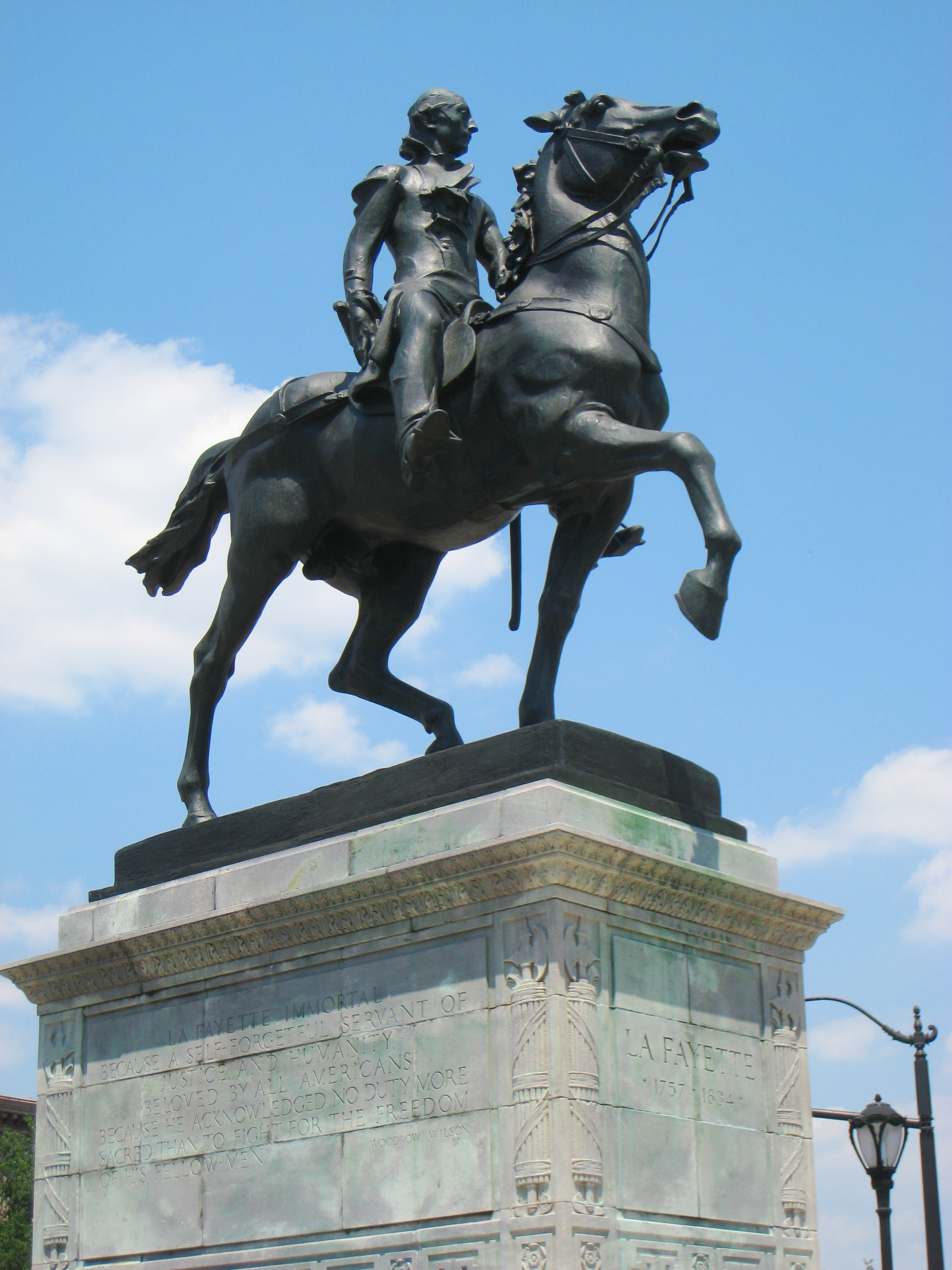
- Artist: Paul Wayland Bartlett's (1865-1925)
- Year: 1924
- Medium: Bronze
- Dimensions: 490 cm × 240 cm × 490 cm (192 in × 96 in × 192 in)
- Location: Baltimore, Maryland; 39°17′49.92″N 76°36′56.3″W
- Owner: City of Baltimore

The Lafayette Monument is a bronze equestrian statue of Gilbert du Motier, marquis de Lafayette, by Andrew O'Connor, Jr.

It is located on the northern edge of the South Park, at Mount Vernon Place, Baltimore, directly across a cobblestone circle from The Washington Monument. It was dedicated on September 6, 1924, with President Calvin Coolidge in attendance.

The inscription reads:
(Sculpture, front edge, proper left side:)
ANDREW O'CONNOR
1924
(Sculpture, rear proper left side:)
T. F. MCGANN & SONS CO FOUNDRY
BOSTON MASS
(Base, front:)

LA FAYETTE
1757 1834

(Base, east side:)

EN 1777 LA FAYETTE TRAVERSANT LES MERS

AVEC DES VOLONTIERS FRANCAIS
EST VENU APPORTER UNE AIDE FRATERNELLE
AU PEUPLE AMERICAIN
QUI COMBATTAIT POUR SA LIBERTE NATIONALE
EN 1917
LA FRANCE COMBATTAIT A SON TOUR
POURDEFENDRE
SAVIE
ET LA LIBERTE DU MONDE. L'AMERIQUE QUI
N'AVAIT JAMAIS OUBLIE LA FAYETTE A
TRAVERSE LES MERS POUR AIDER LA FRANCE
ET LE MONDE A ETE SAUVE

R. POINCARE

(Base, west side:)
LA FAYETTE IMMORTAL
BECAUSE A SELF-FORGETFUL SERVANT OF
JUSTICE AND HUMANITY
BELOVED BY ALL AMERICANS
BECAUSE HE ACKNOWLEDGED NO DUTY MORE
SACRED THAN TO FIGHT FOR THE FREEDOM
OF HIS FELLOW-MEN.
WOODROW WILSON.
signed Founder's mark appears.

== See also ==
- List of public art in Baltimore
