= Mildred Barnes Royse =

American composer, pianist and teacher

Mildred Barnes Royse (9 February 1896 – 25 February 1986) was an American composer, pianist and teacher. She published music under the names Mildred Barnes and Mildred Royse.

Royse was born in Illinois to Lulu F. and John A. Barnes. In 1920, she earned a teacher's diploma at the American Conservatory of Music in Chicago, then pursued advanced studies at Columbia University. She married Morton W. Royse in 1927 and they had one daughter. Royse studied privately with Walter Piston and Leo Sowerby from 1928 to 1932, then taught piano and theory at the Midtown Music School in New York from 1937 to 1938.

Royse's music was published by H. W. Gray, Mercury Music Corporation and White Smith & Company. Her works included:

== Chamber ==
- Five Pieces (violin and piano)
- Haitian Suite (woodwinds and percussion)
- Trio (clarinet, viola and piano)

== Operetta ==
- Gingerbread Man (for children)
- Naughty Ninky (for children)

== Orchestra ==
- Suite for Strings

== Piano ==
- Theme and Eight Variations

== Vocal ==
- Christmas Folk Song (mixed voices; text by Lizette W. Reese)
- Five Historical Songs
- Four Anthems (mixed choir)
- My Help Cometh from the Lord Psalm 121 (SATB with piano or organ)
- Snowbound Mountains: White Russian Folk Song (SATB with piano)
