= William H. Watson =

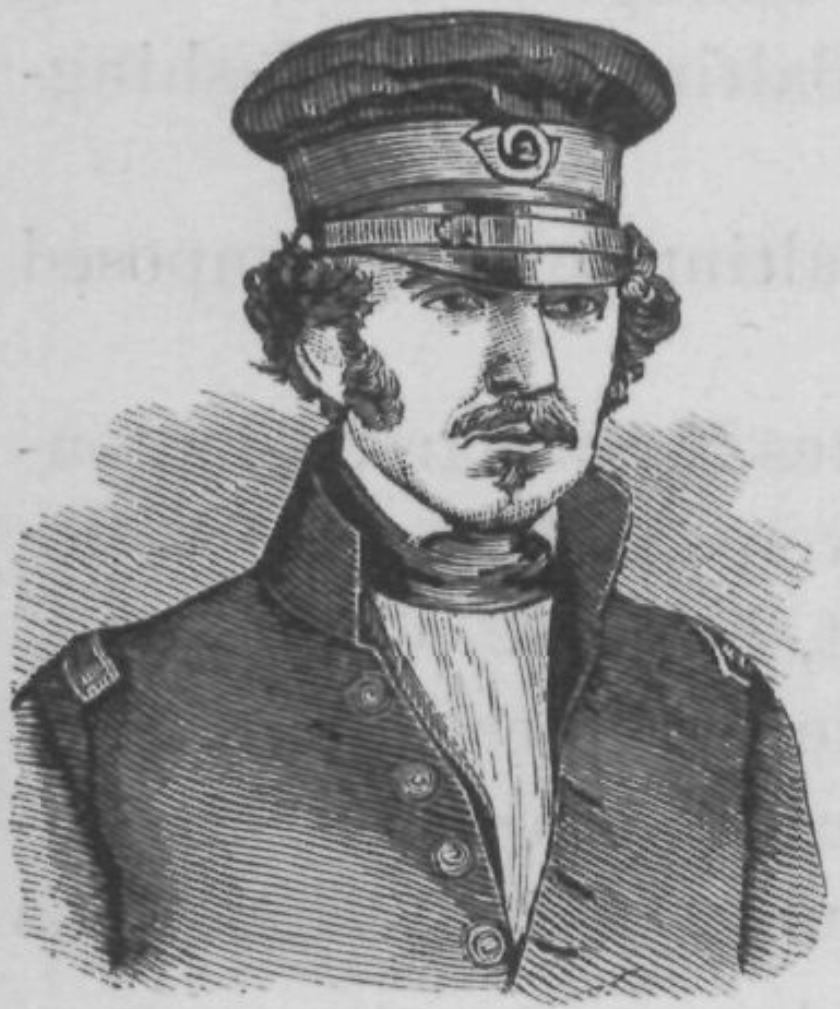
- Born: 1808
- Died: September 22, 1846 (aged 37–38); Battle of Monterrey

Lieutenant Colonel William H. Watson (1808 – September 22, 1846) commanded the Battalion of Baltimore and District of Columbia Volunteers in the Mexican–American War. Prior to that, he had been a captain in the "Independent Blues" Company of the 5th Maryland and served with the West Indies Squadron of the United States Navy against pirates. He was killed in the Battle of Monterrey on September 22, 1846.

== Reference in state song ==
Watson is mentioned in the fourth verse of the official state song "Maryland, My Maryland." The song was written in 1861, fifteen years later after Watson's death in Mexico, by James Ryder Randall while teaching in Louisiana, after hearing about the outbreak of rioting and loss of life as Massachusetts and Pennsylvania militia troops in Baltimore. The troops were marching between the President Street Station of the Philadelphia, Wilmington and Baltimore Railroad west on Pratt Street to the Camden Street Station of the Baltimore and Ohio Railroad to get to Washington, D.C., in response to President Abraham Lincoln's request for 75,000 volunteers and proclamation of a state of rebellion after the shelling of Fort Sumter in Charleston harbor in South Carolina on April 14, 1861, at the beginning the Civil War. This "First Bloodshed of the War" was also called the Pratt Street Riot. The "Maryland" song became a Southern battle hymn during the War and was later adopted as the official state song in 1939.

== Baltimore monument ==
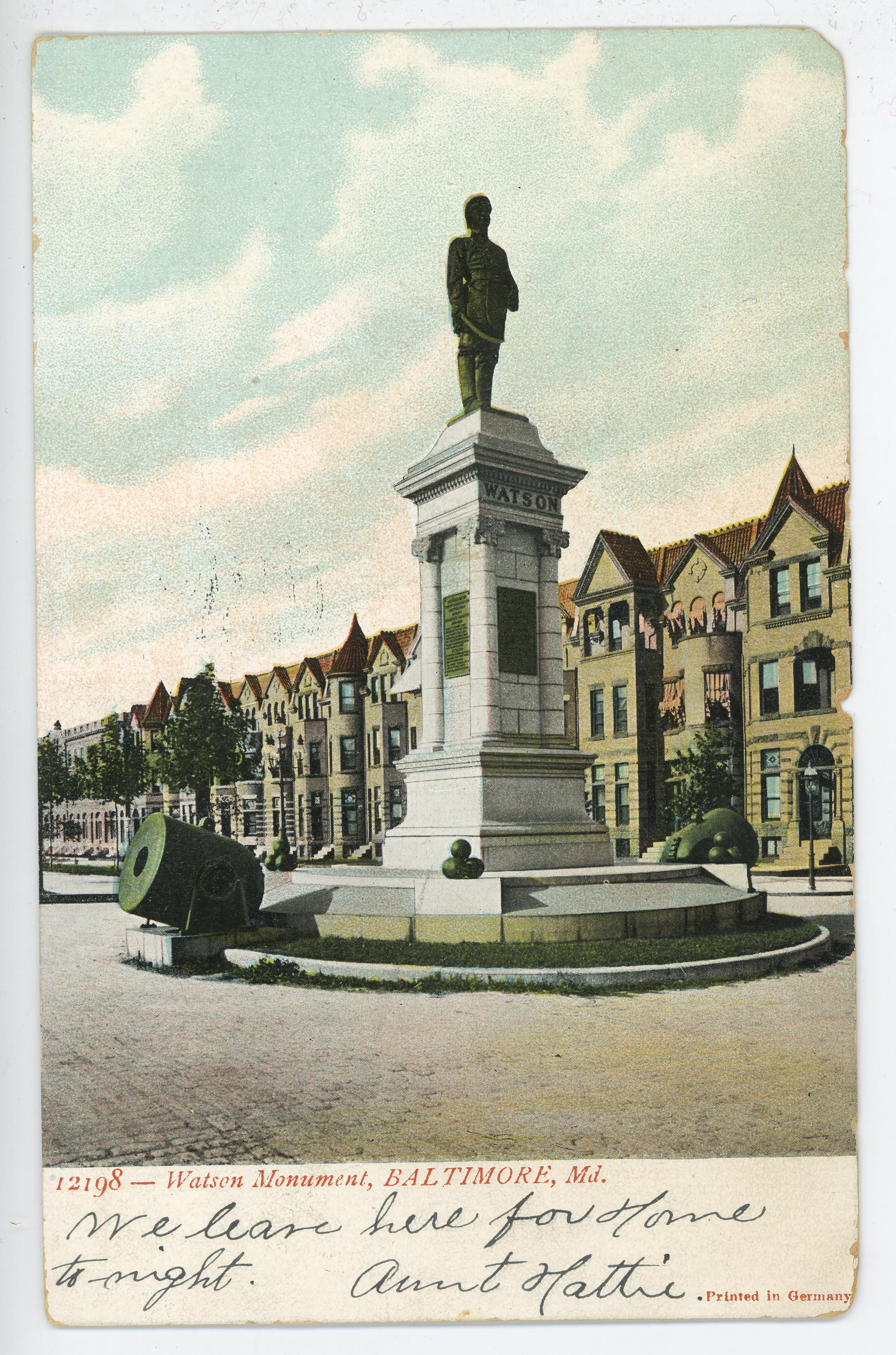
The monument as illustrated in a postcard, circa, 1901–1907. Postmark: September 17, 1907.

A monument to Watson exists at the corner of West North Avenue and Mount Royal Terrace in Baltimore near the old Gateway Entrance Pillars to Druid Hill Park where it was re-located in 1930. Previously, the Monument with its ten-foot bronze statue by famed local artist Edward Berge, (1876–1924), placed on a granite pedestal, flanked by two captured Mexican Army mortars was erected and dedicated in late September 1903, on the 57th anniversary of his death at the Storming of Monterrey in Mexico on September 22, 1846. Bronze plaques on either side of the pedestal record the names of those killed in the engagement, the surviving members of the Maryland Association of Veterans of the Mexican War, the deceased members of the Veterans, and the members of the Monument/Memorial Committee. It was unveiled by his sole surviving child—a daughter, Monterey Watson Iglehart, who was born on the day her father was killed. The statue was covered by the same U.S. flag that shrouded his body when it left Mexico to be transported home. The main speaker and orator for the ceremonies that day was Edwin Warfield (1848–1920), who was the founder (1890) and president of the influential Fidelity and Deposit Trust Company of Maryland (located in a landmark granite skyscraper headquarters, built 1894, at North Charles and West Lexington Streets (it was one of only a few tall older buildings which were not razed in the late 1950s and 1960s, during the re-development of the central business district known as Charles Center, and was still standing in 2013). Warfield was elected the next year as the 45th Governor of Maryland (1904–1908). Several other Baltimore and Maryland officials were joined by surviving veterans and their leaders along with representatives of other veterans groups from other wars. The original site of the Watson Monument when it was dedicated was at the intersection of West Mount Royal Avenue and West Lanvale Street, several blocks southwest of its later location. It was moved back then in 1930 because of a planned extension to the north of North Howard Street.
