= Columbus Monument =

The Columbus Monument may refer to:

- Columbus Monument, Barcelona, Spain
- Columbus Monument (Buyens), in Massachusetts, United States
- Columbus Monument (Canessa), in Maryland, United States
- Columbus Monument (New York City), United States
- Christopher Columbus Monument (West Orange, New Jersey), United States
- Columbus Monument (Syracuse, New York), United States

== See also ==
- List of monuments and memorials to Christopher Columbus
- Monument to Christopher Columbus (disambiguation)
- Statue of Christopher Columbus (disambiguation)
