= Military Courage =

Statue by Paul Dubois in Baltimore, Maryland, U.S.

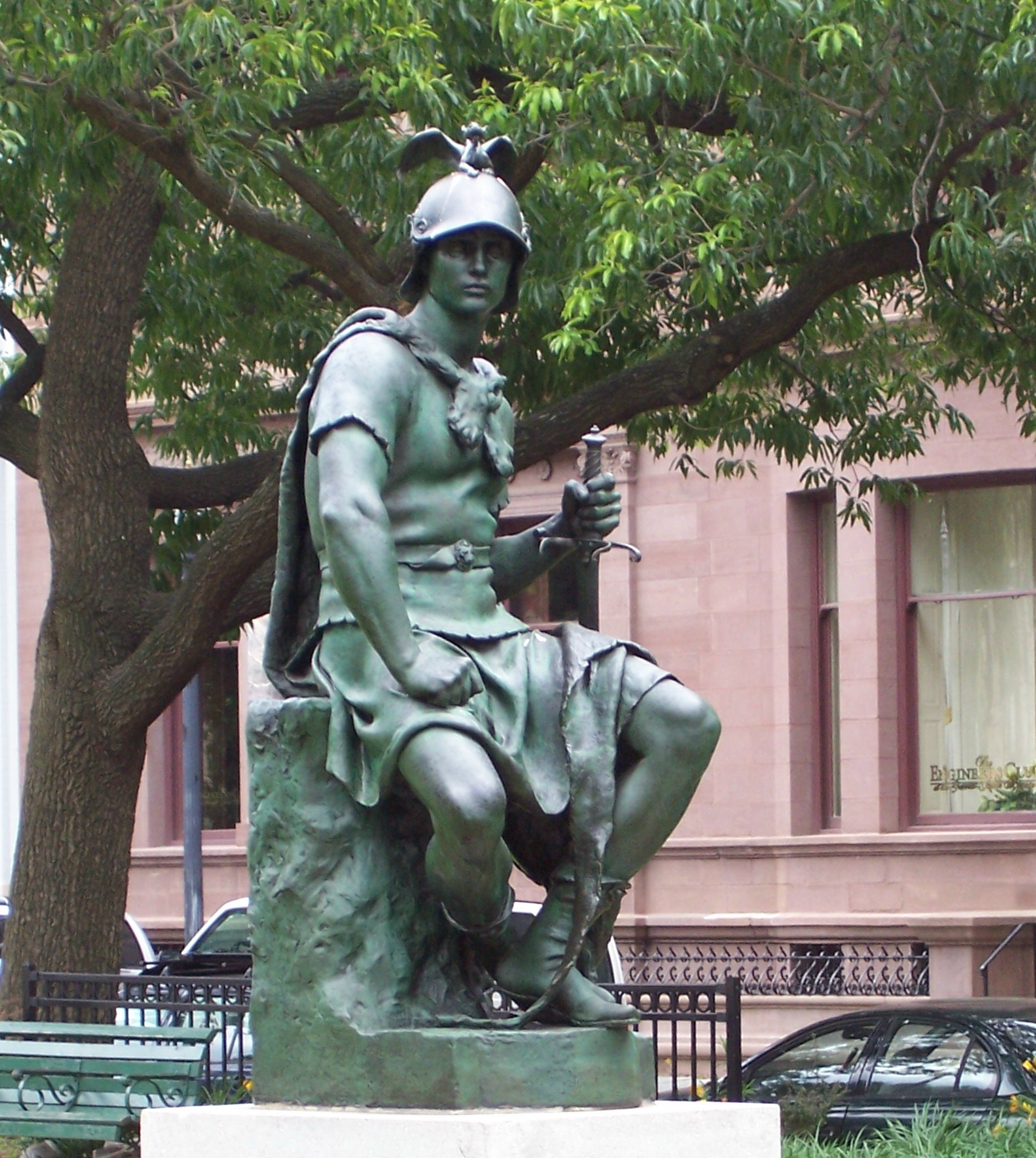
- Artist: Paul Dubois
- Year: 1885
- Medium: Bronze
- Dimensions: 180 cm × 61 cm × 81 cm (70 in × 24 in × 32 in)
- Location: Baltimore, Maryland; 39°17′50.95″N 76°37′0.45″W
- Owner: City of Baltimore

Military Courage is a bronze statue, by Paul Dubois.

It is located in the West Garden, at Mount Vernon Place, Baltimore. The statue is a copy of the original, on the Cenotaph of General Jucault de Lamoricière in Nantes Cathedral, given by William Thompson Walters. A reduced example is in the Walters Art Museum.

== See also ==
- 1885 in art
- List of public art in Baltimore
