= Lizette Woodworth Reese =

American poet

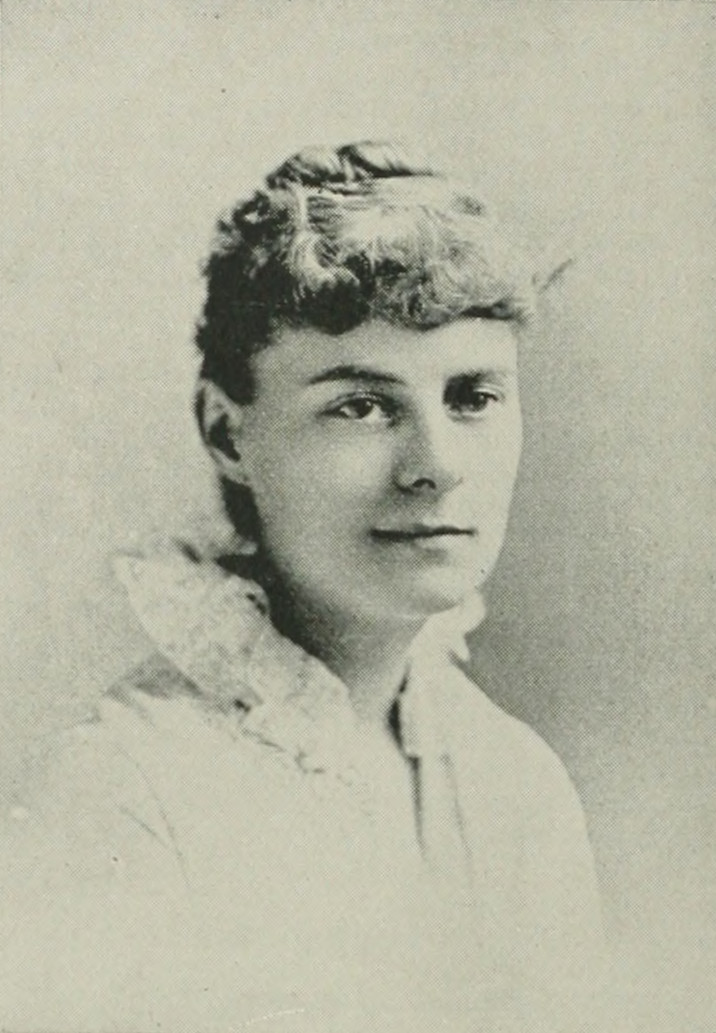
- A Woman of the Century
- Born: January 9, 1856 Baltimore, Maryland, U.S.
- Died: December 17, 1935 (aged 79)
- Resting place: St. John's in the Village Church, Baltimore, Maryland
- Occupation: Poet

Lizette Woodworth Reese (January 9, 1856 – December 17, 1935) was an American poet and teacher. Born in Maryland, she taught English for almost five decades in the schools of Baltimore. Though Reese was successful in prose as well as in poetry, the latter was her forte; she was named Poet Laureate of Maryland in 1931.

She developed, even in her childhood, a strong and vigorous faculty with lyrics. As an adult, her creations were commended by critics in Europe and the United States. In her use of the sonnet, Reese displayed skill and facility of execution. Her sonnet entitled "Tears" was characterized as having a pure John Miltonic note, above all in the preluding lines. This form of verse afforded a rich and stimulating field for Reese's rhythmic and metric capabilities. Her published works include: "A Branch of May"; "A Handful of Lavender"; "A Quiet Road"; "The Cry of the Old House"; "Anne"; "Keats"; "The Daffodils"; "Trust"; "In Time of Grief"; "An English Missal"; and "A Celtic Maying Story". A biography of Reese, as well as a discussion of her poetic achievements, may be found in the Library of Southern Literature, by Letitia Humphreys Yonge Wrenshall of Baltimore.

== Early years and education ==
Lizette Woodworth Reese was born in the then-suburban community of Waverly near Baltimore, Maryland, to Louisa Gabler and David Reese, who had fought with the Confederate Army in the Civil War. She had a twin sister named Sophia. Educated in Baltimore's public schools, Reese graduated from Eastern High School (Baltimore), where a memorial for her stands today.

== Career ==
After graduation, she became a school teacher at St. John's Parish School in 1873. The following year, Reese published her first poem, "The Deserted House," in Southern Magazine. She continued to publish in various magazines until her first self-published anthology, A Branch of May, in 1887. Subsequent books followed in 1891 and 1896, A Handful of Lavender and A Quiet Road, respectively. During the late 1890s and early 1900s, Reese wrote infrequently. However, her sonnet "Tears," published in Scribner's Magazine in 1899, garnered her praise and recognition, particularly from fellow Baltimore writer H. L. Mencken, who stated that Reese's work was “one of the imperishable glories of American literature." In 1918, Reese retired from teaching after having worked her last few years at Western High School (Baltimore). American composers Mildred Barnes Royse (1952) Margaret Shelley Vance (1966) set Reese’s text to music in compositions both entitled “A Christmas Folk Song.” Composers Gary Bachlund, Fritz Hart, Margaret Ruthven Lang, Marilyn Rinehart, and Mildred Souers also set texts by Reese to music.

In 1931, Reese was named Poet Laureate of Maryland by the General Federation of Women's Clubs. She was also honorary president of the Poetry Society of Maryland and a founding member of the Woman's Literary Club of Baltimore in 1890.

== Personal life ==
Reese died on December 17, 1935. She is buried at the St. John's Episcopal Church. After her death, one of Reese's friends, sculptor Grace Turnbull, was commissioned to create a monument to her work. The marble statue, entitled "The Good Shepherd," stands on the old grounds of Eastern High School, Reese's alma mater, in Waverly.

== Works ==
- A Branch of May (1887)
- A Handful of Lavender (1891)
- A Quiet Road (1896)
- A Wayside Lute (1909)
- Spicewood (1921)
- Wild Cherry (1923)
- The Selected Poems (1926)
- Little Henrietta (1927)
- Lizette Woodworth Reese: The Pamphlet Poets (1928)
- A Victorian Village: Reminiscences of Other Days (1929), illustrated by J. J. Lankes
- White April (1930)
- The York Road (1931)
- Pastures and Other Poems (1933)
- The Old House in the Country (1936)
- A Little Song of Life (Glad that I live am I) (date?)
