= Grace Turnbull =

American painter

- Born: December 30, 1880
- Died: December 26, 1976 (aged 95)
- Education: Maryland Institute College of Art; Pennsylvania Academy of the Fine Arts; Art Students League of New York; Rinehart School of the Maryland Institute
- Occupations: artist and writer
- Notable work: Python of India

Grace Hill Turnbull (December 30, 1880 – December 26, 1976) was an American painter, sculptor and writer.

== Biography ==
Born to a cultured family in Baltimore, Turnbull studied painting at the Maryland Institute College of Art, the Pennsylvania Academy of the Fine Arts, and the Art Students League of New York. She then turned her attention to sculpture, studying at the Rinehart School of the Maryland Institute and in Rome. In 1914 she received the Whitelaw Reid Prize in Paris, and she received the Anna Hyatt Huntington Prize in 1932 and 1944.

Turnbull was notorious during her life for her commitment to abstinence in many fields – she objected strenuously to alcohol, and served only apple juice at her own gatherings – and her support for civil rights. She lived in Baltimore for much of her life in a house and studio, which was designed by her brother Bayard.

Besides her artistic pursuits she wrote a number of books, including Tongues of Fire (1929) and Fruit of the Vine (1950). Her autobiography Chips from My Chisel was published in 1953, and she also editor Essence of Plotinus (1934). Turnbull also wrote pamphlets and contributed articles to a variety of publications. One example is the eight page pamphlet, Battle Front as Seen by a Sculptor, published by the Women's International League in 1936.

Turnbull's 1941 sculpture, Python of India, is owned by the Metropolitan Museum of Art, while two of her public artworks, a memorial to Lizette Woodworth Reese and a statue of a naiad, remain in Baltimore. A collection of her papers is held at Syracuse University. Her house at 223 Chancery Road in the Guilford neighborhood, which she had willed along with a collection of artworks to the Maryland Historical Society, still stands. Her work was the subject of a retrospective exhibition at the Baltimore Museum of Art in 1996.
