= Mary Blackford Fowler =

American painter

Mary Zay Blackford Fowler (1892–1982) was an American painter and sculptor.

Born in Findlay, Ohio, Fowler was an alumna of Oberlin College; after graduation she moved to Washington, D.C., where she took lessons under Carl Mose, Hans Schuler, and J. Maxwell Miller at the Corcoran School of Art. Long active as an artist in Washington, between 1940 and 1947 she was commissioned to produce a bust of Frederick Gillett. In 1943 she crafted three reliefs, Captain Newport Brings News and Aid to the Starving Colonists, Early Industries, and Present Day Industries, in unglazed terra cotta for the Works Progress Administration for placement in the United States federal building in Newport News, Virginia. Fowler was married to noted classicist Harold North Fowler, and during their tenure in Washington they were prominent members of local society. When Jacqueline Kennedy was redecorating the White House in 1962, she contributed a set of chairs to decorate the Red Room. Fowler was also a children's writer, penning Picture Book of Sculpture with her husband. Later in life she and her husband returned to Findlay; she is buried there in the Maple Grove Cemetery. The Hancock Historical Museum owns her still-life painting Winter Bouquet of around 1940.
