= Statue of Christopher Columbus (Baltimore) =

Former public statue by Mauro Bigarani in Baltimore, Maryland, U.S.

Christopher Columbus
- Columbus Piazza in April 2015
- Artist: Mauro Bigarani
- Completion date: 8 October 1984
- Medium: Marble sculpture
- Subject: Christopher Columbus
- Dimensions: 4.2 m (14 ft)
- Condition: Destroyed, dumped in the Inner Harbor
- Location: Eastern Avenue & President Street Baltimore, Maryland, U.S.; 39.28536°N 76.60372°W
- Owner: City of Baltimore

The Christopher Columbus Monument was a marble statue of the explorer Christopher Columbus in the Little Italy neighborhood of Downtown Baltimore, Maryland. The monument was brought down by protesters and dumped into the Inner Harbor on July 4, 2020, one of numerous monuments removed during the George Floyd protests. The statue has been reproduced by the Knights of Columbus using a government grant, and in October 2025, it was announced that one of the replicas would be displayed at the White House.

== Description ==
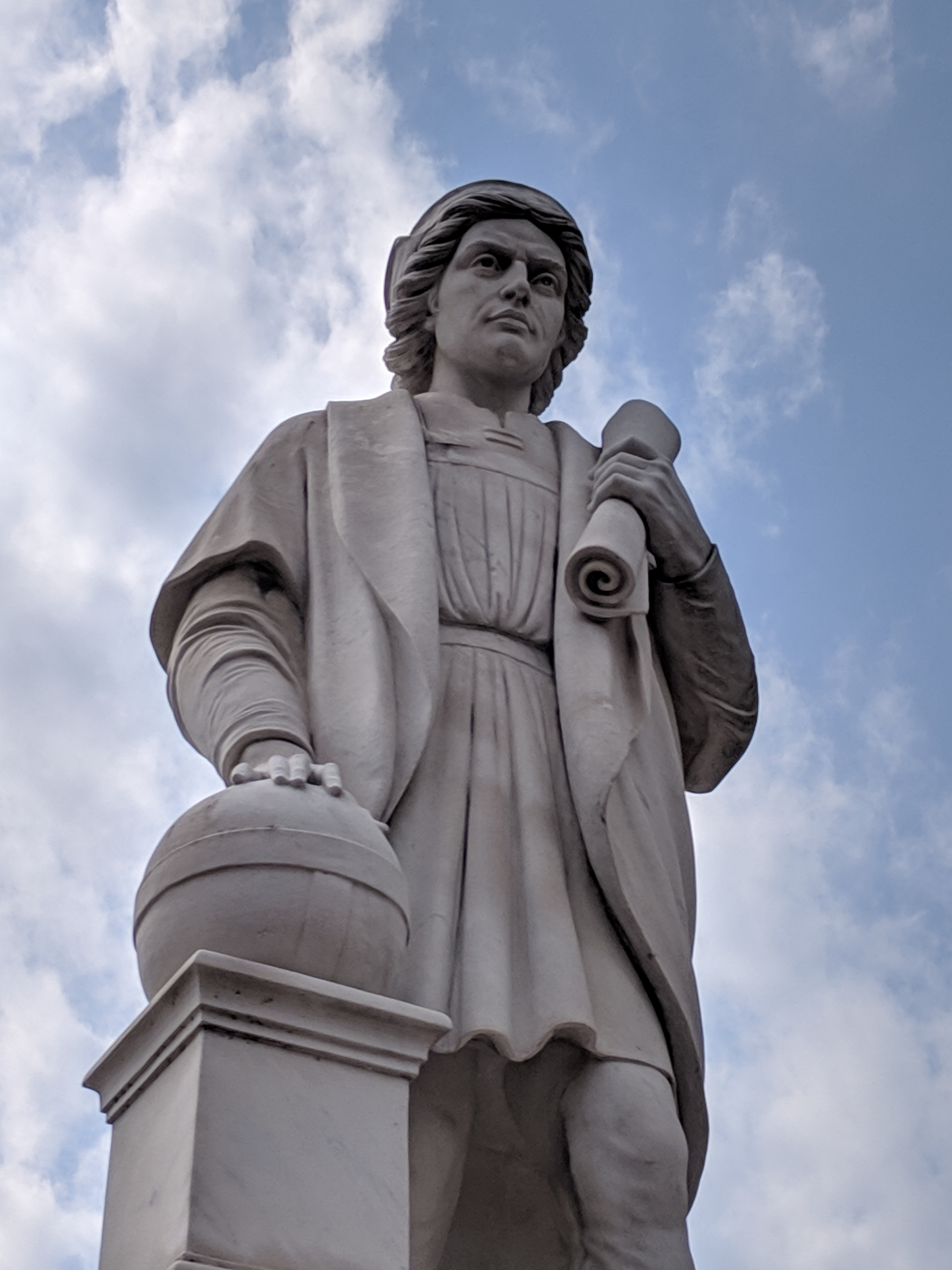

The marble sculpture depicted Christopher Columbus. The memorial included a marble base featuring the three ships of the Columbus fleet: the Niña, the Pinta, and the Santa María. It bore the inscription "Discoverer of America."

== History ==
The Christopher Columbus Monument was the newest of Baltimore's three monuments dedicated to the explorer Christopher Columbus. Located in Columbus Piazza, in front of Scarlett Place condominiums, the sculpture was designed by Mauro Bigarani and was commissioned by donations from the Italian American Organization United of Maryland and the Italian American community of Baltimore. The statue was unveiled by then-Mayor William Donald Schaefer and President Ronald Reagan in October 1984.

=== Vandalism and destruction ===
On Independence Day 2020, a group of protestors gathered at the piazza to remove the statue by lassoing the top of the monument, according to footage of the event. The monument subsequently fell to the ground and broke into fragments. The protesters continued by rolling the body of the statue into the Jones Falls canal of the Baltimore Harbor.

The event came days before a warning made by the organization known as the Baltimore BLOC that the group would be destroying the monument if the city did not take upon the action themselves. Afterwards, Baltimore BLOC celebrated and applauded their "kinfolk" involved in the statue's destruction.

During the days leading up to the statue's demise, former State Senator John Pica attempted to raise funds for the statue's relocation, which was estimated to be approximately $100,000. On June 26, 2020, supporters of the monument, including state delegates Nino Mangione (Delegate Pat McDonough who was at the ceremony in 1984) Kathy Szeliga as well as state senator Johnny Salling, gathered to promote keeping the monument as it stands.

As with many of the recent monument removals across America, reactions were mixed. Governor Larry Hogan denounced the vandalism and instead encouraged having a "constructive dialogue" regarding monument removal. Mayor Jack Young commented that the statue's destruction was "part of a national and global reexamination over monuments".

=== Replicas ===
The statue was fished out of the river by the Knights of Columbus. The statue had broken into twelve pieces and was determined to be unsalvageable, however the Knights of Columbus said they would reproduce it. By October of 2020, a statue mold was being made. It was estimated to cost $80–85,000, and that they had raised nearly half the funds at that point. It will not return to its original spot. In November the National Endowment for the Humanities announced that they would give $30,000 to the Knights of Columbus to help assist with the recreation of the statue, along with three others. Two replicas were created using a mixture of resin and marble remnants from the original statue. On October 13, 2025, it was announced that one of the replicas would be displayed on the grounds of the White House. A replica was placed on the north side of the Eisenhower Executive Office Building in March 2026.

== See also ==
- List of monuments and memorials to Christopher Columbus
- List of monuments and memorials removed during the George Floyd protests
- List of public art in Baltimore
