= J. Maxwell Miller =

American sculptor

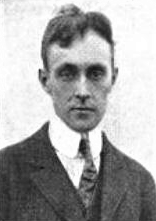
- Born: Joseph Maxwell Miller; December 23, 1877; Baltimore, Maryland
- Died: February 20, 1933 (aged 55); Baltimore, Maryland
- Burial place: Green Mount Cemetery
- Education: Maryland Institute School of Art and Design; Rinehart School of Sculpture
- Occupation: Sculptor

Joseph Maxwell Miller (December 23, 1877 – February 20, 1933) was an American sculptor.

== Biography ==
J. Maxwell Miller was born in Baltimore, Maryland on December 23, 1877. He studied at the Maryland Institute School of Art and Design and at the Rinehart School of Sculpture with William Rinehart in Baltimore. He also studied with Raoul Verlet at the Julian Academy in Paris.

Miller was a member of the National Sculpture Society and exhibited at their 1923 exhibition where he showed a bas relief portrait of Daniel Coit Gilman and a number of medals.

He became the Director of the Rinehart School of Sculpture in 1923, a position he held for the last decade of his life.

Miller lived most of his life in Baltimore. He died at Union Memorial Hospital on February 20, 1933, and was buried at Green Mount Cemetery.

Miller's pupils included Mary Blackford Fowler.

== Works ==
- Confederate Women's Monument, Baltimore, Maryland
- James Cardinal Gibbons Jubilee Medal, 1911 in the Museum of American Art of the Pennsylvania Academy of Fine Art, Philadelphia, Pennsylvania
- New Hanover County World War One Memorial, Wilmington, North Carolina.
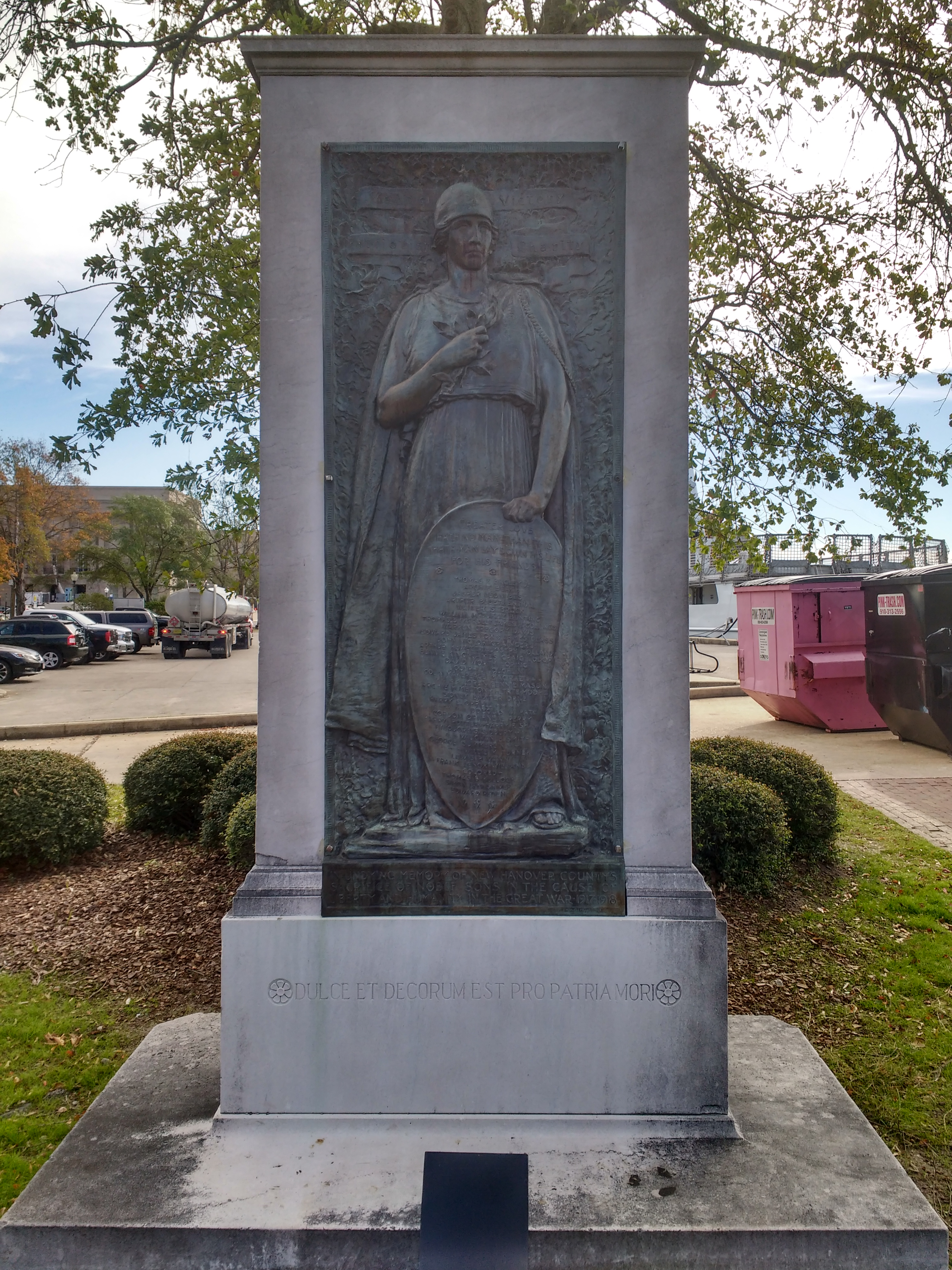
New Hanover County World War One Memorial in Wilmington, North Carolina
