= Edward Berge =

American sculptor (1876–1924)

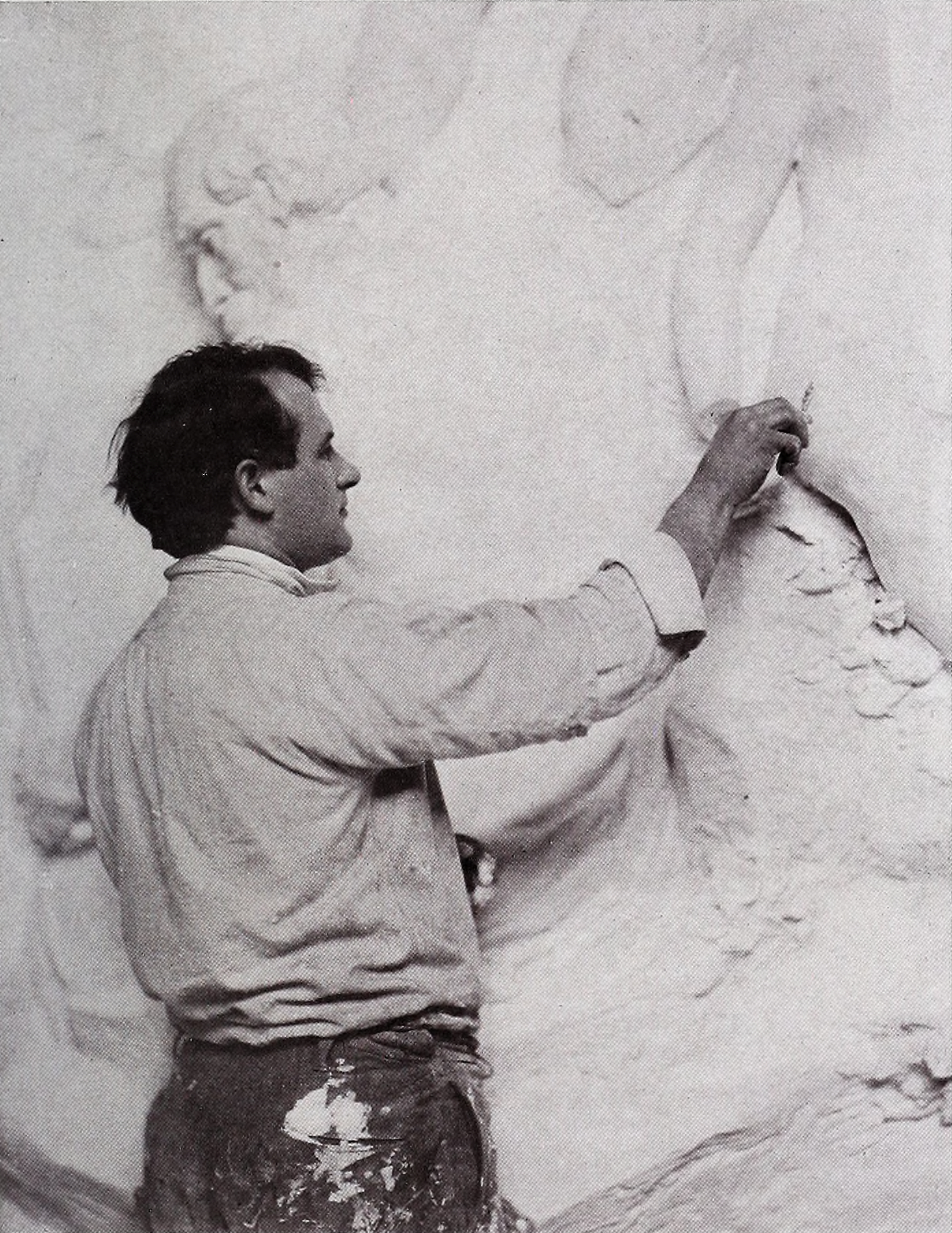
Edward Berge

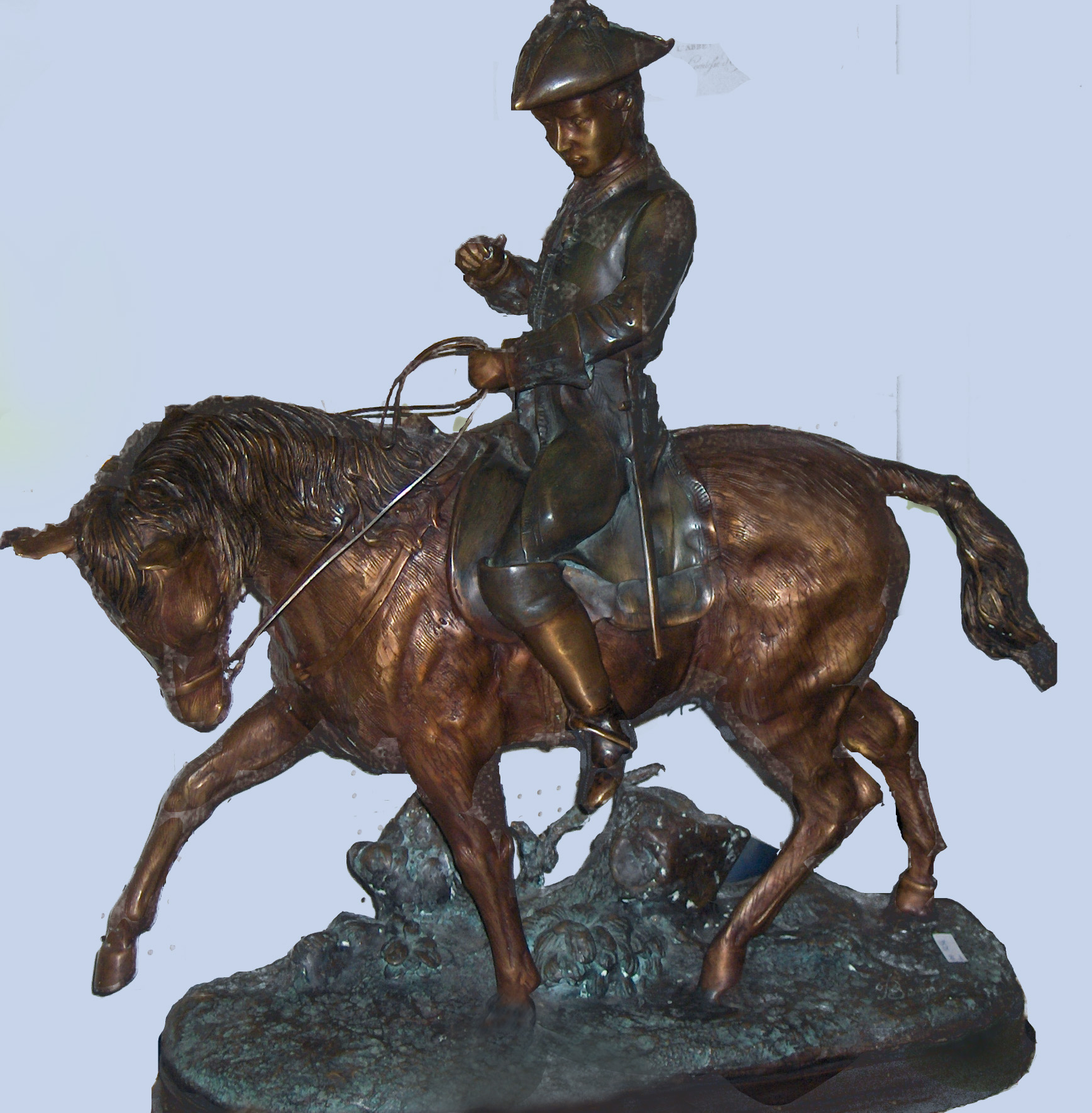
"American soldier on horseback" (private collection)

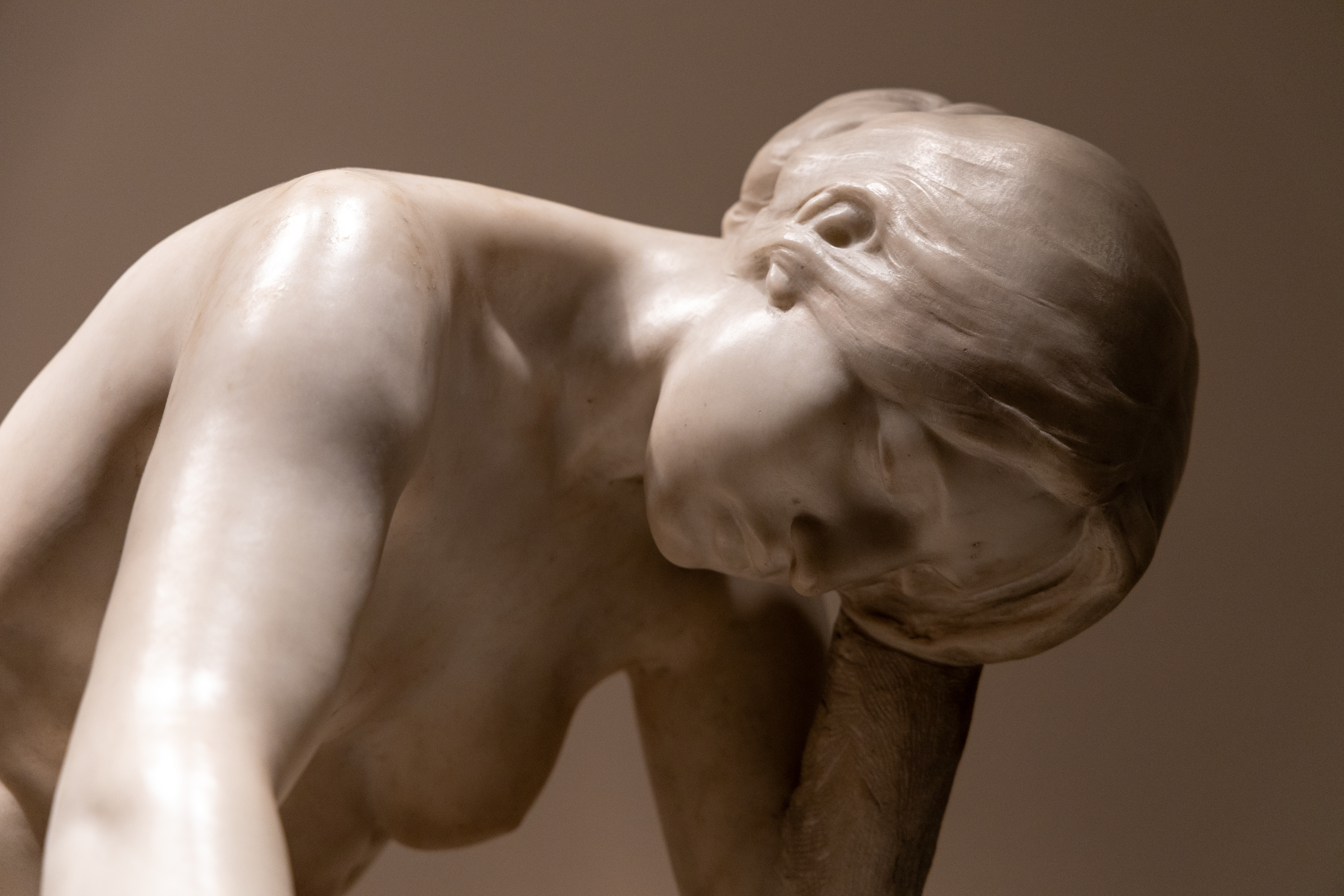
Muse Finding Head of Orpheus

Edward Henry Berge (1876–1924) was an American sculptor. He is mainly known for his bronze monumental works and figures, created in the traditional manner in contrast with the avant-garde work of his contemporaries.

Berge was born in Baltimore, Maryland in 1876. He studied at the Maryland Institute (currently known as the Maryland Institute College of Art or MICA) and was part of the first class of the Rinehart School of Sculpture, which comprised three boys and four girls. The other two boys were J. Maxwell Miller and Hans Schuler. Upon completion of Rinehart School study, the three went together to Paris where they enrolled in the Académie Julian for three years and studied under Raoul Verlet and Auguste Rodin. Berge was a member of the National Sculpture Society and the National Arts Club.

At 2:00 p.m. on Sunday, October 12, 1924, Berge suffered a heart attack while working alone in his studio on his latest piece. His nephew was contacted, who in turn summoned Berge's physician. The physician recommended that Berge be taken home to rest. At approximately 3:30 p.m., Berge experienced a second heart attack and died alone during the brief period his wife had left to obtain medication. Although he had received treatment for indigestion in the preceding months, Berge was believed to have been in good health. He was 48 years old.

His son, Henry Berge (1908–1998) was also a sculptor and focused on bas-relief.

== Sculpture ==
Berge mainly worked in marble and bronze and completed many monuments, portrait busts and relief sculptures, many of which are on display outdoors or in public buildings in Baltimore City, including:

- Armistead, Fort McHenry.
- Chapin A. Harris, Wyman Parkway and 31st St.
- Latrobe, Broadway and Baltimore St.
- On the Trail, Clifton Park.
- Sea Urchin, Johns Hopkins University.
- War Memorial, Cherry Hill Administration Building.
- Watson, Mt. Royal Terrace at North Ave.
- Wildflower, Homeland Garden.
- Muse Finding the Head of Orpheus, Walters Art Museum (original stone maquette), Lorraine Park Cemetery (bronze at Berge family plot).
