= Monument to Christopher Columbus =

Monument to Christopher Columbus may refer to:

- Monument to Christopher Columbus (Buenos Aires), Argentina
- Monument to Christopher Columbus (Galway), Ireland
- Monument to Christopher Columbus (Charles Cordier), Mexico
- Monument to Christopher Columbus (Buenavista, Mexico City), Mexico
- Monument to Columbus (Madrid), Spain
- Monument to Columbus (Salamanca), Spain
- Monument to Columbus (Valladolid), Spain

== See also ==
- Columbus Monument
- Statue of Christopher Columbus
- List of monuments and memorials to Christopher Columbus
