= Columbus Obelisk =

Monument to Christopher Columbus in Maryland, United States

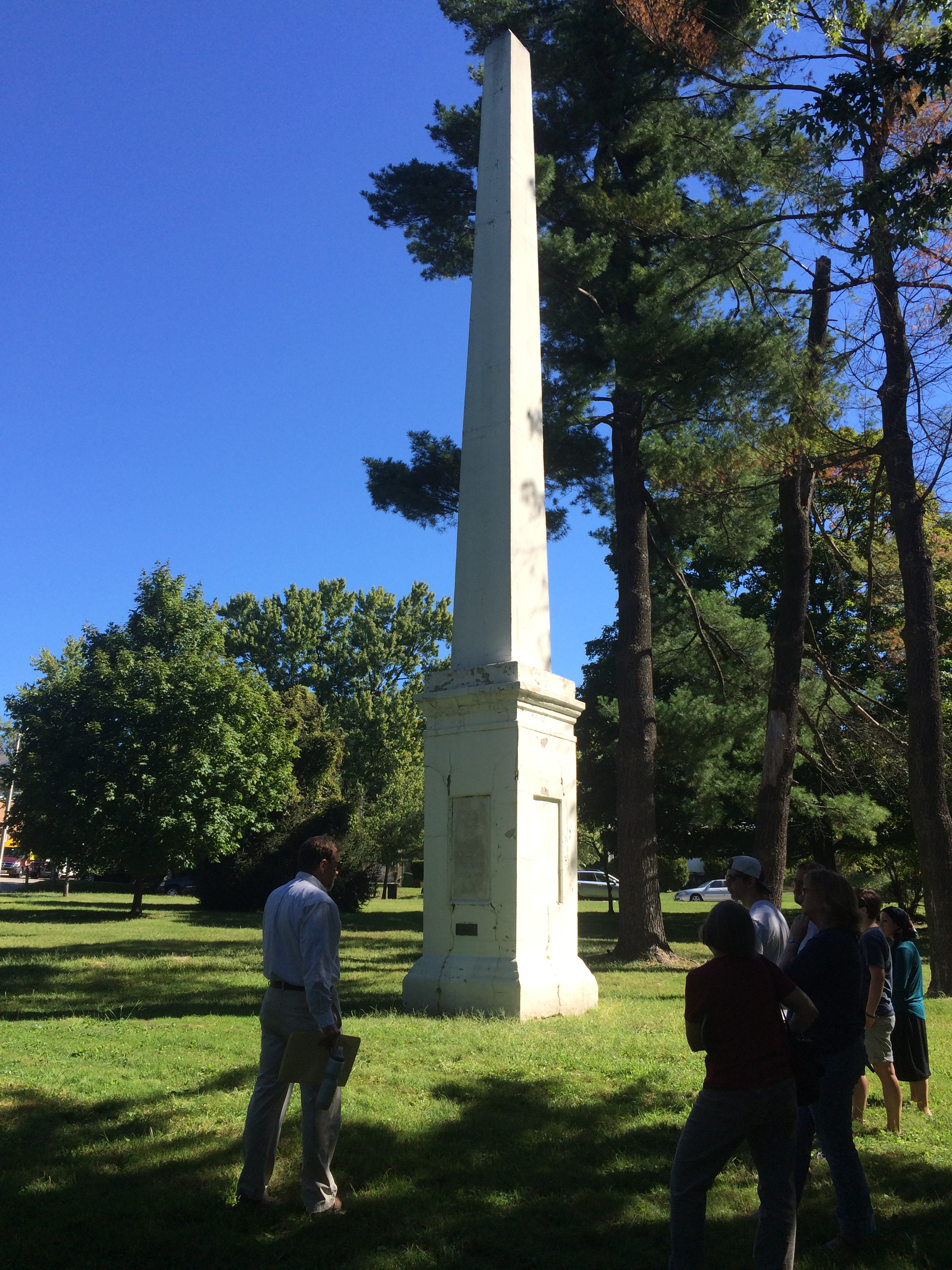
- Monument in 2016
- Artist: Unknown
- Year: 1792
- Medium: Brick and white stucco
- Dimensions: (44 ft. 6 3/4 in. in)
- Location: Baltimore, Maryland, U.S.; 39.336349°N 76.574523°W
- Owner: City of Baltimore

The Columbus Obelisk is one of three monuments to Christopher Columbus in Baltimore, Maryland. Erected on 12 October 1792, the obelisk is the oldest monument to Christopher Columbus in the United States.

On the monument the inscription read “Sacred to the Memory of Chris. Columbus / Octob. XII MDCCVIIIC.” until the plaque with this message was destroyed in 2017.

== History ==
The Columbus Obelisk was donated by the French Consul to the City of Baltimore, Charles François Adrian de Paulmier, Chevalier d'Anmour, in 1792 to commemorate the tricentennial anniversary of Columbus's discovery of America. The monument was originally located on d'Anmour's estate on North Avenue and Harford Road. On October 12, 1964, it was rededicated and moved to its present location in Herring Run Park at Harford Road, Walther Avenue, and Parkside Drive.

=== Vandalism ===
In August 2017 the monument was vandalized by a group of individuals inspired by efforts to remove Confederate monuments; they posted a video of themselves performing the act on YouTube. In the video, one person sledgehammers the base of the structure, while another holds a sign reading "Racism. Tear it Down". In October 2017, Mayor Catherine Pugh authorized the city's Commission for Historical and Architectural Preservation to restore and relocate the monument, and expressed interest in the possibility of rededicating the monument to someone else other than Columbus, due to the controversy surrounding the structure.

In June 2020, the group known as the Baltimore BLOC threatened to destroy the monument by offering Mayor Jack Young a dilemma of either removing all Columbus memorials or face vandalism as a consequence.

=== Proposed renaming ===
In 2020, Councilman Ryan Dorsey introduced legislation to rename and rededicate the monument as "The Police Violence Victims Monument." On November 16, 2020, Baltimore Mayor Jack Young vetoed the legislation, citing concerns by Baltimore Police Department Commissioner Michael S. Harrison. The City Council, with a vote of 9 to 6, failed to override the mayor's veto on December 8, 2020.

== See also ==
- List of public art in Baltimore
- List of monuments and memorials to Christopher Columbus
- Monument and memorial controversies in the United States
