= Edward Sheffield Bartholomew =

American sculptor

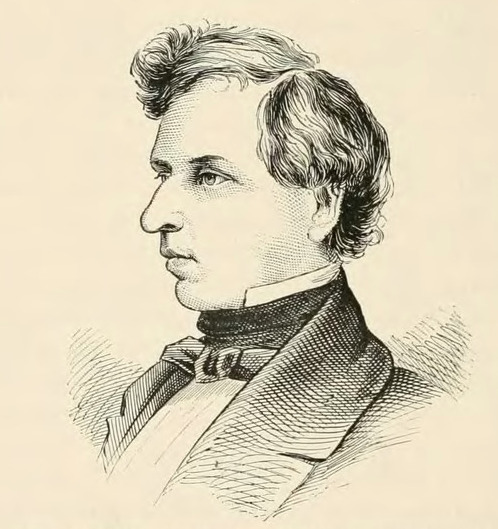
- self-portrait
- Born: 1822; Colchester
- Died: 2 May 1858; Naples
- Occupation: Sculptor

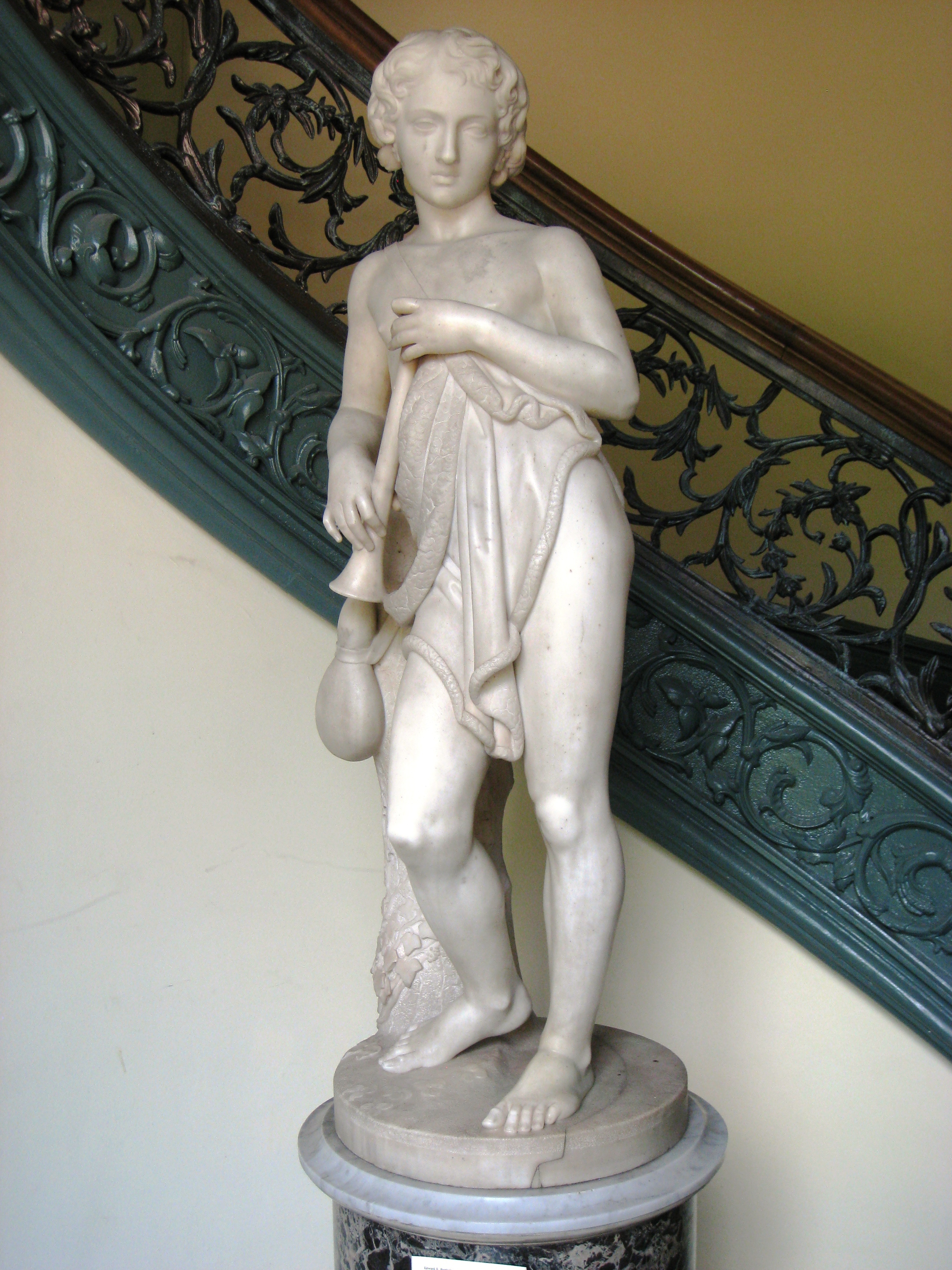
Campagna Shepherd Boy, by Edward Sheffield Bartholomew

Edward Sheffield Bartholomew (c. 1822 - May 2, 1858) was an American sculptor.

Bartholomew was born in Colchester, Connecticut. After apprenticeships as a bookbinder and dentist, his first employment was as a dentist in Hartford, but he soon abandoned it for painting and (after learning that he was color-blind) sculpture. In 1844 he studied at the National Academy of Design's antique class in New York City, from 1845-1848 directed the Wadsworth Atheneum in Hartford, contracting a severe case of smallpox circa 1847, then studied for another year in the National Academy of Design and sailed for Europe. From 1851 onwards he lived in Rome and died in Naples of bronchitis.

Bartholomew is known for his bas reliefs, marble busts and statues, and medallions in the neo-classical style. His earliest recorded work is a medallion of poet Lydia Sigourney (1847). Among his best-known works are Blind Homer Led by the Genius of Poetry (1851, now in the Metropolitan Museum), Eve, Campagna Shepherd Boy (Peabody Institute), Genius of Painting, Youth and Old Age, Evening Star, Eve Repentant (Wadsworth Atheneum), Washington and Flora, A Monument to Charles Carroll (near Baltimore), Bellsarius at the Porta Pincinia, and Ganymede. Many of his works are now held by the Wadsworth Atheneum.
