= Raoul Verlet =

French sculptor and art professor

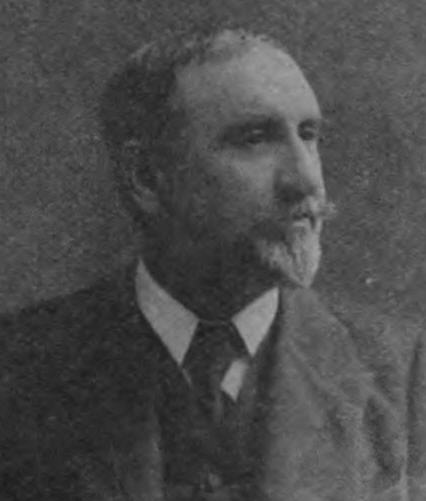
Raoul Verlet (1911)

Charles Raoul Verlet (7 September 1857, Angoulême - 1 December 1923, Cannes) was a French sculptor and art professor.

== Biography ==
His father was the concierge at the Angoulême cemetery. He initially sculpture in Bordeaux, from 1884 to 1886, then enrolled at the École des beaux-arts de Paris, where he studied with Jules Cavelier and Louis-Ernest Barrias for four years. While there, he was awarded a medal that earned him a scholarship.

In 1885, he obtained an honorable mention at the Salon for a bust of doctor Jean-Baptiste Bouillaud. Later, he entered a competition for a monument, honoring those from Charente who had died during the Franco-Prussian War. The jury that chose him was composed of many notable artists, including Alexandre Falguière, Antonin Mercié, Pierre Puvis de Chavannes, Jean-Léon Gérôme, Emmanuel Frémiet and Jules Dalou. He was then chosen for another war monument in Châteauroux that was dedicated in 1897.

As his reputation grew, he received commissions for statues and monuments in Paris, Rouen, Marseille, Cognac and Louviers. Two of his best known are those honoring Marie François Sadi Carnot, in Angoulême, and Guy de Maupassant, at the Parc Monceau in Paris. He was named a Knight in the Legion of Honor in 1893; becoming an Officer in 1900.

He eventually settled in Louviers, where his wife was from, and became President of the "Société des Amis des Arts de l'Eure", but he continued to maintain a studio in Paris and taught at the Académie Julian. After 1905, he was a teacher at the École Beaux-Arts and, in 1910, was named a member of the Institut de France. During the 1910s, he created a series of statues honoring the national heroes of Colombia, which may be seen throughout Bogotá.

His son, the poet Paul Verlet, was seriously wounded during World War I and died before him, in 1922.

== Selected works ==
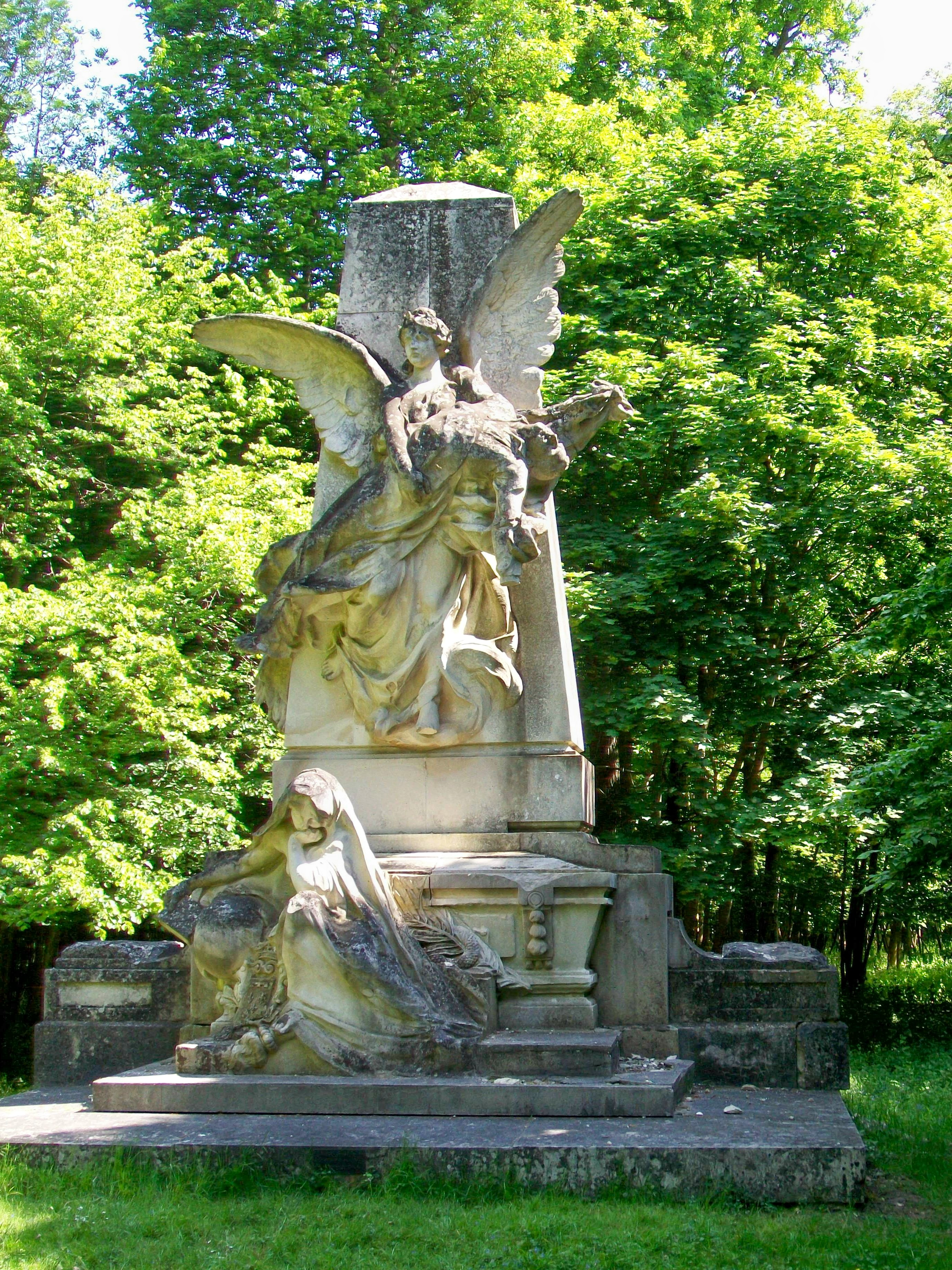
Henri d'Orléans,
Château de Chantilly.

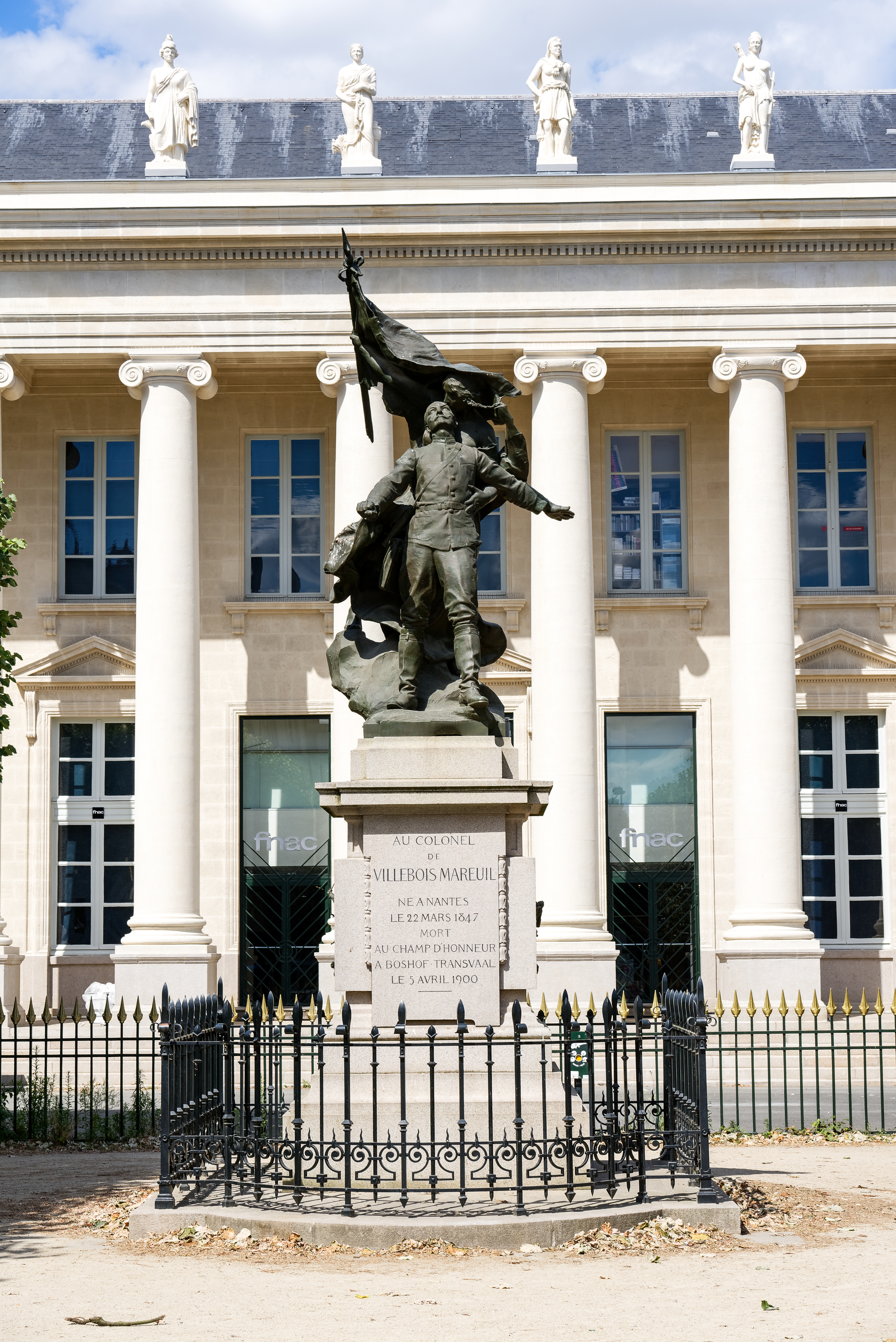
Georges de Villebois-Mareuil, Nantes

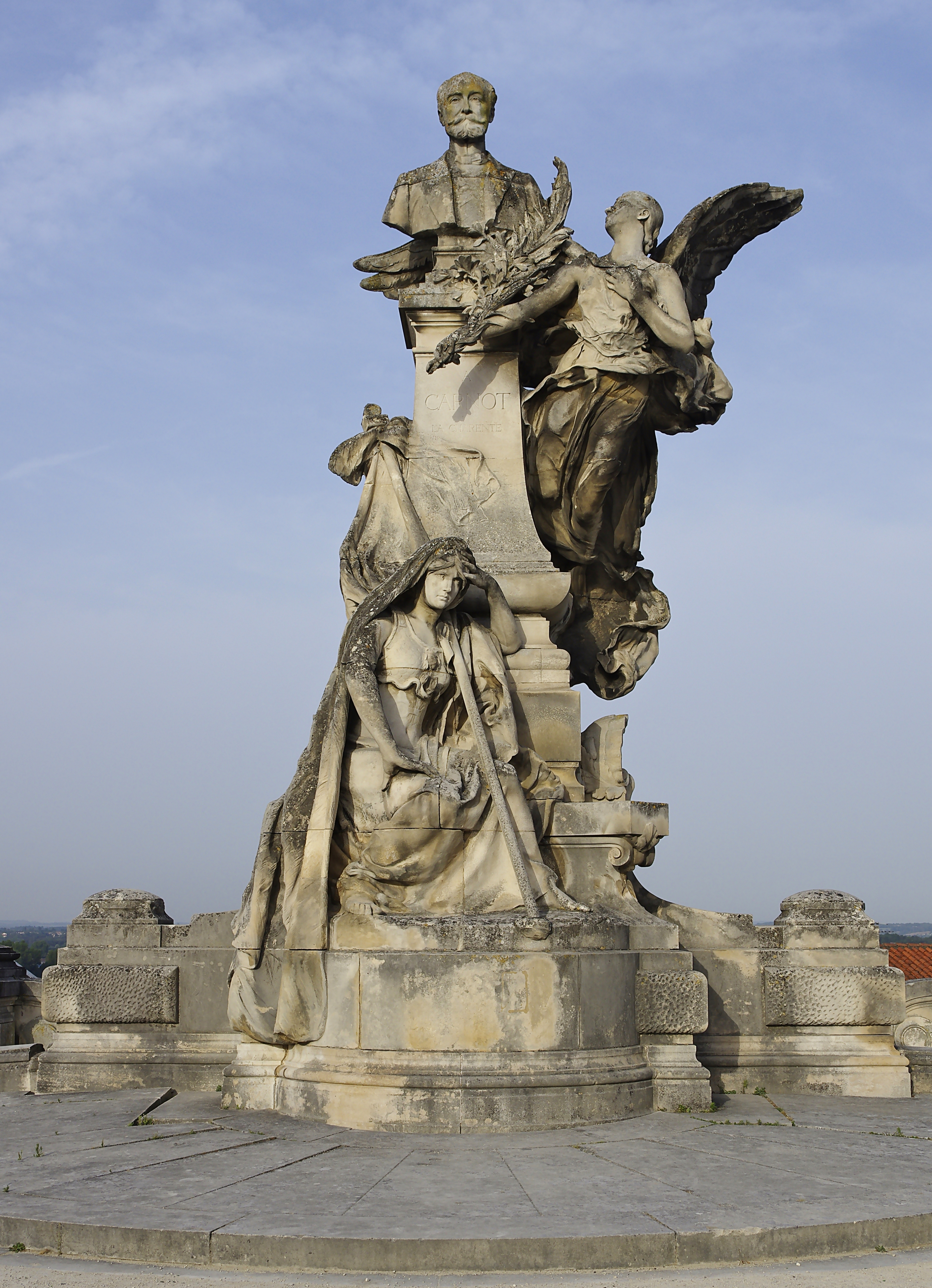
Monument to Sadi carnot, Angoulême

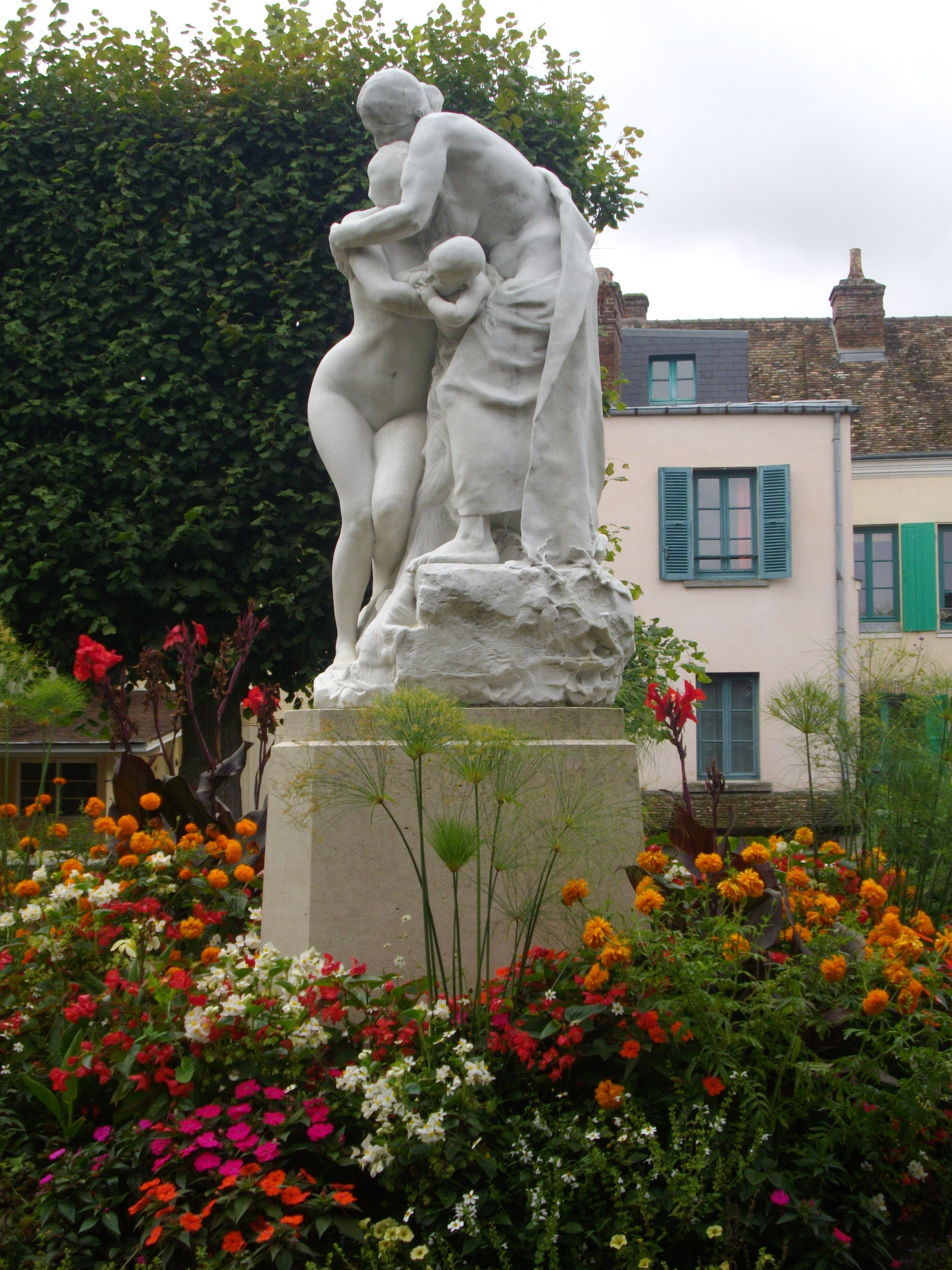
"The Prodigal Girl", Dreux

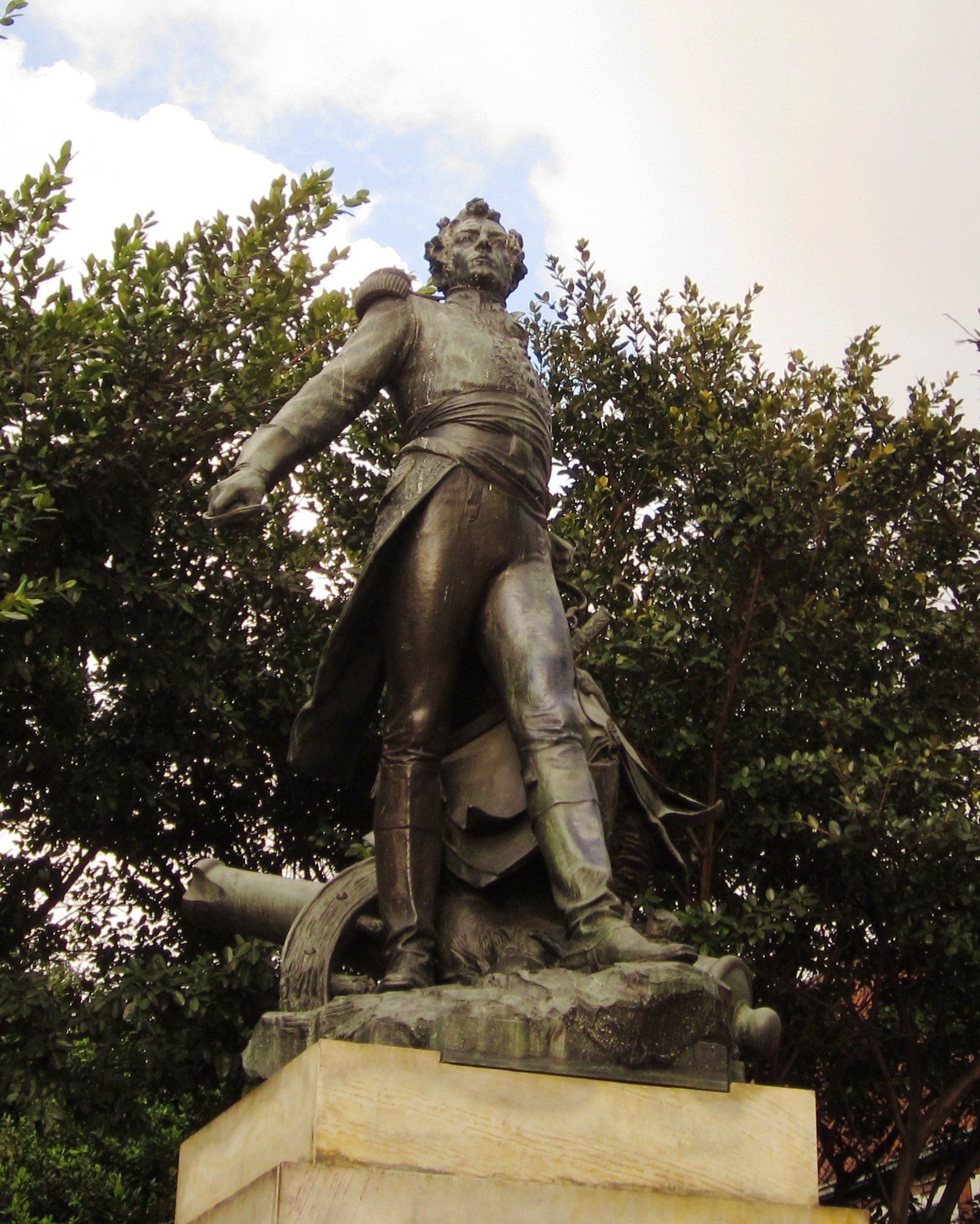
Antonio José de Sucre, Bogotá

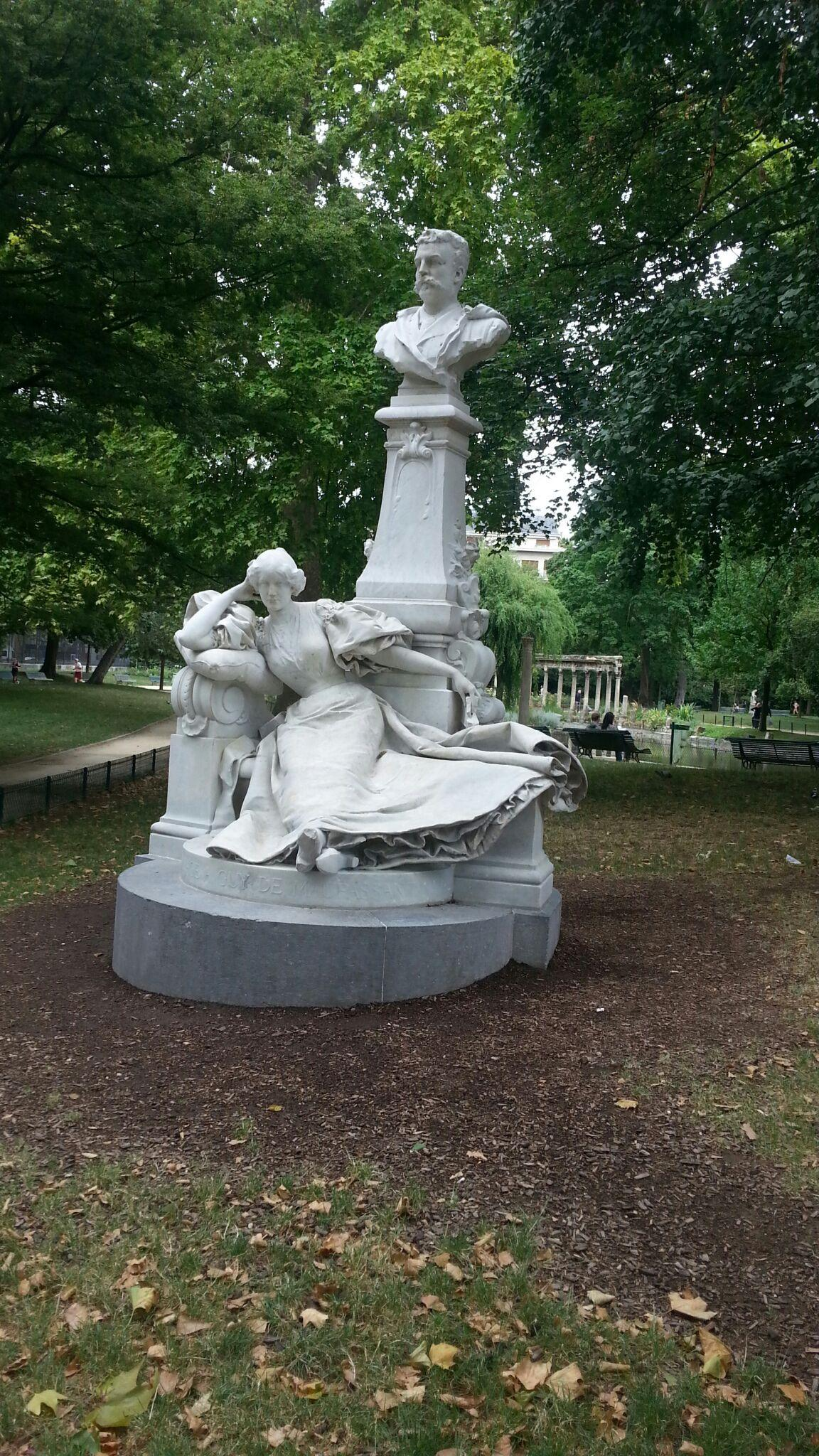
Guy de Maupassant,
Parc Monceau
