= Jonathan Silver (sculptor) =

American sculptor

- Born: Jonathan Silver; November 19, 1937; New York City
- Died: July 10, 1992 (aged 54); New York City
- Education: 1963, BS, Columbia University; 1966, MA, Art History, Columbia University phD (candidate) Dissertation Topic: Giacometti, studied under Meyer Schapiro, Columbia University 1968–69, Edward J. Noble Fellow in Art, Columbia University
- Known for: Sculpture, Visual arts

Jonathan Silver (November 19, 1937 – July 10, 1992) was an American figurative sculptor, and visual artist "known for infusing classical forms with an extreme, implicitly modern sense of emotion." His work draws from the hellenistic tradition, as well as Rodin, Giacometti and Freudian psychoanalysis.

== Background ==
Jonathan Silver was born in Brooklyn New York. His father, Edward Silver, was a District Attorney. Edward Silver published an article in the Journal of Criminal Law and Criminology in Spring of 1964 discussing the pros and cons of wire tapping and how to acquaint ourselves with the pros.

Silver started his career as an art historian, first studying at Columbia University art history graduate department under Meyer Schapiro. He never finished his PHD thesis on Giacometti but instead started drawing and making plaster heads which later turned into large complex figurative plaster and clay installations which were often critiqued in the New York Times by art critic Michael Brenson and others. Silver went on to cast many of his large ethereal figures from plaster to bronze. His art has been exhibited at Sculpture Center, NYC; the Walker Art Center in Minneapolis, Minnesota; the Gruenebaum Gallery, NYC; Charles Center at Johns Hopkins University, Baltimore, Maryland; the Queens Museum, NYC; The Academy of Arts and Letters, NYC; Victoria Munroe Gallery, and many others.

"Silver began to explore frontality, he was aware that since the Middle Ages, as mobility was becoming essential to the ethos of Western life, frontally had become essentially taboo. Strict frontality – that is to say frontally in which the sides of a head are symmetrical and the face is perpendicular to the ground – denies movement. A Byzantine or Egyptian head holds movement in the face and eyes, which has the effect of freezing the viewer in place. While a naturalistic head created a sense that time unfolds and that the ability to move through time and space freely is the viewer's right, frontality stops time. The aura of timelessness is essential to the religious power many frontal images have. But Silver knew there was more to frontality than this. He was fascinated by meditations on Hellenistic and Jewish culture, and from Thorleif Boman's "Hebrew Thought Compared with Greek," he absorbed the idea that for Jews, the static is always active and dynamic. When he studied the frontal head, he saw that it was inherently ambiguous: if you outline a circle (the general shape of a head) ad then draw a straight line down its center, you will see that the sides flip back and forth. In his attempt to explore mire deeply the reasons for the intense responses to frontality over the centuries, he studied the Rorschach test, whose symmetrically around a central vertical line is essential to its ability to set the unconscious in motion. Silver came to believe that exploring frontality could lead him into repressed areas where well-springs of anxiety, sexuality, insight and creativity lie. Far from denying movement, frontality could inspire images that did justice to the experience of contemporary movement by tapping emotional and psychological energies so raw and chaotic that they seemed uncontrollable." (Michael Brenson, Jonathan Silver: Heads, Sculpture Center Catalogue)

== Education ==
- 1963, BS, Columbia University
- 1966, MA, art history, Columbia University
- PhD (candidate) dissertation topic: Giacometti, studied under Meyer Schapiro, Columbia University
- 1968–69, Edward J. Noble Fellow in Art, Columbia University

== Career ==
Silver did not begin to exhibit his work until 1976, when he was nearly 40, having begun his academic career as an art historian. Meyer Schapiro was impressed by Silver’s intellectual prowess and supported his dissertation on Giacometti at Columbia. However Silver began making sculpture seriously in the late 1960s and never completed his doctorate. He had his first one-man show at the New York Studio School in 1984. His early work in plaster focused on deconstructing and reinventing the human head. In the second half of the 1980s he became known for his ambitious immersive installation pieces composed of imposing abstract figures.

The show at the Lower Room was a pivotal show in Jonathan’s career. The sculptures represent the passion Jonathan has for sculpture, and his true skill. Each element was given space to stand alone, but together the exhibition was haunting. A true theatre production. Jonathan lectured on art history and taught sculpture throughout his career. In the late 1960s he taught at the University of North Carolina at Greensboro. He taught at Parsons School of Design from 1983 to 1984. At the time of his death, he was teaching at both Montclair State College in New Jersey, where he had been an assistant professor of fine arts since 1970, and the New York Studio School.

Michael Brenson of the New York Times, followed the arc of Silver's career over his lifetime and spoke at his funeral. "His attempt during the last 10 years to make his sculpture fully three-dimensional and alive from multiple points of view without losing its commanding presence – was heroic and more complex emotionally and intellectually than I can understand now."

=== Lectures ===
- 1975, Montclair Museum of Art, Modern Art, Six Lectures, Montclair, New Jersey Haverford College, The Biblical Subject, Joseph and Potiphan's Wife in Art with special reference to late work of Gaughan, Haverford, Pennsylvania
- 1976, Haverford College, Giacometti: Frontality and Cubism, in conjunction with James Lord and Michael Brenson for the Giacometti Seminar, Haverford, Pennsylvania
- Rhode Island School of Design, Giacometti's Painting, Providence, Rhode Island
- 1977, Rhode Island College, Giacometti's Painting, Providence, Rhode Island
- 1979, Parsons School of Design, Narrative and Structure, Ten Lectures, New York, New York
- 1981, New York Studio School, Classical Styles, Two Lectures, New York, New York
- 1982, University of Pennsylvania, The Sculpture of Jonathan Silver and Christopher Cairns, M.F.A. Program, Pennsylvania
- 1988, The Montclair Art Museum, Montclair, New Jersey
- 1991, The New York Studio School, New York, New York

=== Visiting critic ===
- 1975, Parsons School of Design, New York, New York
- 1976, Rhode Island School of Design, Providence, Rhode Island
- 1977, New York Studio School, New York, New York
- Haverford College, Haverford, Pennsylvania
- 1978, Haverford College, Haverford, Pennsylvania
- 1979, New York Studio School, New York, New York
- 1982, New York Studio School, New York, New York
- 1986, University of North Carolina at Greensboro, North Carolina

== Exhibitions ==
Jonathan Silver has had several gallery and museum exhibitions, including at the Walker Art Museum, Sculpture Center, Charles Center at Johns Hopkins University, Lori Bookstein Fine Art, Victoria Munroe Gallery and at the C. Grimaldis Gallery. Several works by the artist have been sold at auction, including 'Woman' sold at Phillips New York, Chelsea '80s' in 2010. There have been several articles about Jonathan Silver, including his NYT obit by Roberta Smith in 1992, 'Art in Review; Jonathan Silver' written by Pepe Karmel for New York Times in 1995. Jonathan Silver has been reviewed many times by New York Times writer Michael Brenson. Brenson is quoted reviewing a sculpture at the Queens Museum show "The Expressionist Surface" in 1990, saying "Jonathan Silver's Subway is a large underground chamber that is both violently animated (with severed limbs and heads and a silvery female figure being sacrificed to subway tracks) and frozen still by the introspection of a seated woman looking for herself in a mirror." Michael Brenson described Jonathan Silver's show "Lower Room" which was on view at the Sculpture Center, NYC, in 1989 as "a place of recollection without tranquility and of terrible dreams," and "one of the most moving sculpture installations in New York in years."

=== One-person exhibitions ===
- 1984, New York Studio School, New York, New York
- 1986, Gruenebaum Gallery, New York, New York
- University of Bridgeport, Bridgeport, Connecticut
- 1987, C. Grimaldis Gallery, Baltimore, Maryland
- 1988, Gremillion & Co. Fine Art, Inc., NY, NY
- 1989, Jonathan Silver – Installation – The Lower Room, Sculpture Center, New York, New York
- Trinity Gallery, Atlanta, Georgia
- Birth of Venus, (permanent installation), Charles Center, Baltimore, Maryland
- 1991, Victoria Munroe Gallery, New York, New York

=== Selected group exhibitions ===
- 1976, Group Exhibition, 4 x 10 Gallery, New York, New York
- Comfort Gallery, Christopher Cairns, Bruce Gagnier, and Jonathan Silver, Haverford College, Haverford Pennsylvania
- 1979, New York Studio School, Jonathan Silver and Christopher Cairns, New York, New York
- 1986, Weatherspoon Art Gallery, Art on Paper, The 22nd Weatherspoon Annual Exhibition, University of North Carolina, Greensboro, North Carolina
- New York Studio School, Heads, New York, New York
- 1987, Queensborough Community Gallery, Romanticism and Classicism, curated by Lenone Malen, Bayside, New York
- Carlson Gallery, Bernard Center, Jonathan Silver and Judith Dolnick, University of Bridgeport, Bridgeport, Connecticut
- 1988, Walker Art Center Sculpture Garden, Wounded Amazon II (permanent installation), Minneapolis, Minnesota
- Triangle Arts Association, Workshop Alumni
- 1990, National Academy of Design, New York, New York
- Queens Museum, The Expressionist Surface, Queens, New York
- 1992, American Academy of Arts & Letters Annual Invitational, New York, New York
- 1993, Macon & Co,., Atlanta, Georgia
- Gremillion & Co. Fine Art, Inc., Houston, Texas

=== Catalogues ===
- Jonathan Silver, The Lower Room An Installation, September 5 – October 7, 1989, Essay: Donna Harkavy.
- American Academy and Institute of Arts and Letters, Invitational Exhibition of Painting and Sculpture, March 2–29, 1992, South Gallery Annex
- Alfred H Maurer and Jonathan Silver: An Installation, December 5, 2002 – January 25, 2003, Lori Bookstein Fine Art
- Jonathan Silver: Heads, Frontality and Narrative: Jonathan Silver's Heads, Sculpture Center, Curated by Michael Brenson, November 14 – December 23, 1995
- Five Sculptors, Peter Agostini, Christopher Cairns, Bruce Gagnier, Jonathan Silver, and George Spaventa, March 31 – April 30, 2006, Cantor Fitzgerald Gallery

=== Recent exhibitions ===
- 2008, C. Grimaldis Gallery, SCULPTURE, featuring Anthony Caro, John Ruppert, Annette Sauermann, Jonathan Silver, Osami Tanaka
- 2008, Lori Bookstein Fine Art, Jonathan Silver: Sculpture
- 2011, Lori Bookstein Fine Art, Summer Paper

== Awards ==
- 1991, The Academy Institute Award in Art, American Academy and Institute of Arts and Letters, New York

== Collections ==
- The Metropolitan Museum of Art, New York
- Mr. Peter Badger, Financial Advirsor at Gremillion, Houston, Texas
- Mr & Mrs. Rick Badger, Houston, Texas
- NYNEX, New York, New York
- The Southeastern Corporation, Atlanta, Georgia
- Thurston Twigg- Smith, Contemporary Museum, Honolulu, Hawaii
- Walker Art Center, Minneapolis, Minnesota (on loan to Denver Botanic Gardens)
- Sid Singer, Mamorneck, New York
- City of Baltimore, Maryland (Johns Hopkins Plaza)
- Weatherspoon Museum, Greensboro, North Carolina

== Private life ==
In 1992, Silver died of cancer. He died at the age of 54 at St. Vincent's Hospital in Manhattan. In addition to his wife, he was survived by a sister, Sara Bunim, and a brother, David, both of Brooklyn.
