= Roger B. Taney (disambiguation) =

Roger B. Taney was a justice of the United States Supreme Court. Roger B. Taney may also refer to:

- Roger B. Taney Monument (Annapolis)
- Roger B. Taney Monument (Baltimore)
- SS Roger B. Taney, a Liberty ship
