= Stonewall Jackson and Robert E. Lee Monument =

Double equestrian statue formerly installed in Baltimore, Maryland, U.S.

Coordinates: 39°19′28″N 76°37′11″W

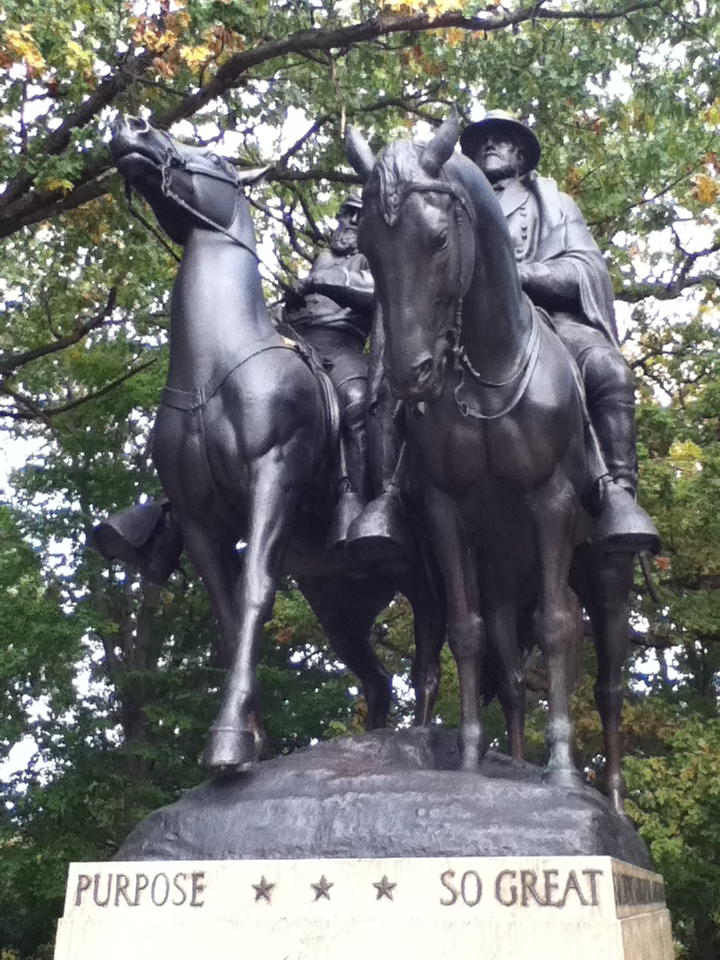
- Stonewall Jackson left, and Robert E. Lee right
- Artist: Laura Gardin Fraser
- Year: 1948; 2017: removed
- Medium: Bronze
- Location: Baltimore, Maryland
- Owner: City of Baltimore

The Stonewall Jackson and Robert E. Lee Monument, often referred to simply as the Jackson and Lee Monument or Lee and Jackson Monument, was a double equestrian statue of Confederate generals Stonewall Jackson and Robert E. Lee, formerly located on the west side of the Wyman Park Dell in Charles Village in Baltimore, Maryland, alongside a forested hill, similar to the topography of Chancellorsville, Virginia, where Stonewall Jackson and Robert E. Lee met before the Battle of Chancellorsville in 1863. The statue was removed on August 16, 2017, on the order of Baltimore City Council, but the base still remains. The monument is in storage, and some city council members have called for all Confederate monuments in the state to be destroyed.

The area surrounding the old monument was rededicated as Harriet Tubman Grove in March 2018 in honor of the noted abolitionist and Underground Railroad conductor.

== Significance ==
The Jackson and Lee Monument was the first double equestrian statue in the United States. Artist Laura Gardin Fraser was the only woman sculptor selected out of five other men to create the monument. Notable architect John Russell Pope was commissioned to design the base of the monument.

== Background ==
Funding for the statue was secured by Colonial Trust Company owner J. Henry Ferguson before he died in 1928. Ferguson provided $100,000 for the erection of the monument. It was dedicated in 1948 in a ceremony at which Governor William Preston Lane Jr. and Mayor Thomas D'Alesandro Jr. spoke. In the 24-page booklet celebrating the dedication, J. Henry Ferguson notes that "Lee and Jackson were my boyhood heroes and mature judgment has only strengthened my admiration for them. They were great generals and Christian soldiers. They waged war like gentlemen, and I feel their example should be held up to the youth of Maryland."

The monument was located on the west side of the Wyman Park Dell along Art Museum Drive from its dedication until its removal by the Baltimore City Government.

== Removal ==
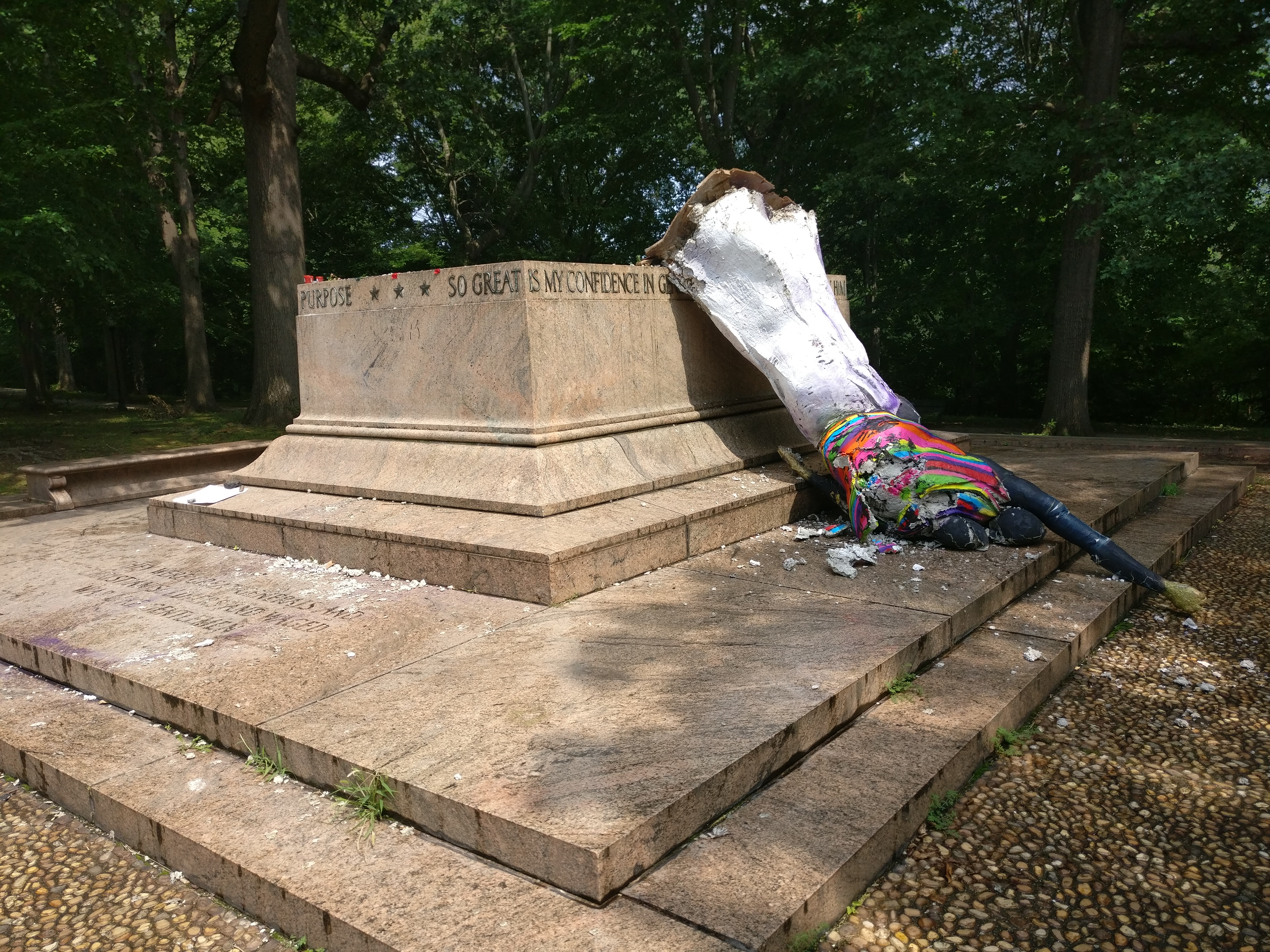
The empty pedestal, two days after the statue's removal.

After the 2015 Charleston church shooting, Mayor Stephanie Rawlings-Blake organized a commission to evaluate removal of the city's four confederate monuments. In January 2016, the commission decided that the Jackson and Lee Monument, along with the Roger B. Taney Sculpture by William Henry Rinehart in Mount Vernon Place, would be removed.

On August 14, 2017, the Baltimore City Council voted unanimously to deconstruct these two monuments along with the Confederate Soldiers and Sailors Monument and the Confederate Women's Monument. The Jackson and Lee Statue was subsequently removed by The Whiting-Turner Contracting Company on August 16, 2017, but the base remains intact. Activists replaced the monument with a papier-mache rendition of a pregnant African-American woman, created by artist Pablo Machioli, which was destroyed shortly thereafter, though it was unclear to observers whether this was due to vandalism or the effects of weather. The pedestal was also repeatedly vandalized with politically motivated graffiti.

== Inscription ==
The base of the sculpture featured the following inscription:

SO GREAT IS MY CONFIDENCE IN / GENERAL LEE THAT I AM WILLING TO / FOLLOW HIM BLINDFOLDED / STRAIGHT AS THE NEEDLE TO THE POLE / JACKSON ADVANCED TO THE EXECUTION / OF MY PURPOSE
(West steps:) THE PARTING OF GENERAL LEE AND / STONEWALL JACKSON ON THE EVE / OF CHANCELLORSVILLE
(East steps:) GIFT OF J. HENRY FERGUSON OF MARYLAND.
(North steps:) THEY WERE GREAT GENERALS AND/ CHRISTIAN SOLDIERS AND WAGED / WAR LIKE GENTLEMEN.

== See also ==
- List of Confederate monuments and memorials
- List of public art in Baltimore
- New Orleans Confederate monuments removal
- Removal of Confederate monuments and memorials
- Roger B. Taney Monument (Baltimore)
