= Elcor =

Elcor may refer to:

- Elcor, Minnesota, a ghost town, United States
- an alien species from the Universe of Mass Effect
