= Sam LoPresti =

American ice hockey player (1917–1984)

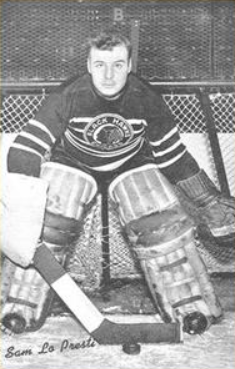
- Born: January 30, 1917 Elcor, Minnesota, U.S.
- Died: December 11, 1984 (aged 67) Eveleth, Minnesota, U.S.
- Height: 5 ft 10 in (178 cm)
- Weight: 207 lb (94 kg; 14 st 11 lb)
- Position: Goaltender
- Caught: Left
- Played for: Chicago Black Hawks
- Playing career: 1937–1951

Samuel Leo LoPresti (January 30, 1917 – December 11, 1984) was an American ice hockey goaltender. He played senior and professional hockey between 1937 and 1951, including two seasons in the National Hockey League (NHL) with the Chicago Black Hawks. He was named an American Hockey Association (AHA) all-star in 1939–40 and the most valuable player of the United States Hockey League in 1949–50. He is best known for his performance with the Black Hawks on March 4, 1941, when he set an NHL record by facing 83 shots in a regulation game against the Boston Bruins. He was inducted into the United States Hockey Hall of Fame in 1973.

LoPresti left the NHL during the Second World War to join the United States Navy and serve on board the SS Roger B. Taney. In 1943 the ship was torpedoed and sunk while crossing the Atlantic Ocean; LoPresti was one of 29 sailors who survived 42 days lost at sea in a single lifeboat before being rescued off the coast of Brazil. LoPresti was credited with saving the lives of his shipmates by killing a dolphin with a sheath knife, providing most of the food they had during their ordeal.

== Early life ==
LoPresti was born January 30, 1917, in Elcor, Minnesota and grew up in the nearby community of Eveleth. In his youth he played football as a tackle and a fullback. He did not wear ice skates until the ninth grade but, inspired by local players Frank Brimsek and Mike Karakas, he became a goaltender and was his high school team's starter by his final year of high school. He played for local junior colleges where he was scouted by the St. Paul Saints of the American Hockey Association (AHA).

== Playing career ==
"They were shooting from every angle and I didn't see half the shots. They were bouncing off my pads, chest protector, my arms, my shoulders. I didn't even know where they were coming from. I lost between eight to 10 pounds that night"

— LoPresti describing his performance on March 4, 1941 against the Boston Bruins, when he faced 83 shots and made 80 saves.

In his first season with the Saints, 1937–38, LoPresti appeared in 48 games, posted a 10–38–2 win-loss-tie record and earned a 3.62 goals against average (GAA). He improved to 23–21–2 the following season. In his third season in St. Paul, he was named to the league's second all-star team after recording 29 wins and 4 shutouts. The Saints won the AHA championship, defeating the Omaha Knights in four games. LoPresti posted a 6–1 record and 1.29 GAA during the playoffs.

During that season, he was discovered by Bill Tobin and Paul Thompson, president and coach of the NHL's Chicago Black Hawks, during an exhibition game between the Saints and the Black Hawks. He was signed by Chicago, and began the season with the AHA's Kansas City Americans. LoPresti was called up to Chicago when Paul Goodman retired. He made his NHL debut on January 5, 1941, and went unbeaten in his first four starts. He appeared in 27 games with Chicago, finishing with a record of 9–15–3. He set a record on March 4 in a game against the Boston Bruins when he faced 83 shots in a regulation game. The Bruins took 42 shots at LoPresti before they scored their first goal, and won the game 3–2.

As Chicago's top goaltender in 1941–42, LoPresti won 21 games and lost 23, and recorded three shutouts. He was his team's star in the Black Hawks' playoff series against the Bruins. He recorded one shutout, but Chicago was eliminated by Boston. He then left the NHL to join the United States Navy during the Second World War, joking that "it was safer to face Nazi U-boats in the North Atlantic than vulcanized rubber in North America."

== Military service ==
LoPresti joined the Navy's armed guard service and served aboard the SS Roger B. Taney as a gunner's mate, assigned to duty protecting ships as they crossed the Atlantic Ocean. The ship was torpedoed and sunk during an Atlantic crossing in February 1943. Listed as missing in action, LoPresti was thought to be the first casualty among American professional athletes in the conflict.

As the Roger B. Taney sank, LoPresti and the other Naval Armed Guards abandoned the ship on rafts, which were picked up the next morning by the lifeboats. He was one of 26 men who took refuge in the number 4 lifeboat with little water and food supplies. The lifeboat traveled towards the South American coast in a voyage of 42 days, traveling nearly 2,500 miles (4,000 km) southwest, before it were found and rescued off the coast of Brazil. The men had collected rain water when they could, at times drinking only 4 imperial fluid ounces (110 mL) per day, and had only a small amount of biscuits and baker's chocolate for food. LoPresti was credited with saving the men's lives by catching the only real food they had during their entire ordeal after noticing dolphins swimming around their boat on one occasion. According to another sailor, LoPresti improvised a weapon by lashing a sheath knife to a boat hook. He plunged into the ocean and caught a 35-pound (16 kg) dolphin. The men hauled it into the boat, drank its blood, and cooked its flesh in a metal bucket with rags and kerosene.

== Later career and personal life ==
LoPresti returned to hockey following his ordeal, but never played in the NHL again. He played two seasons in California with the San Diego Skyhawks, then returned to Minnesota to play several seasons of senior hockey. As a member of the Eveleth Rangers he was named the most valuable player of the North America Hockey League in 1949–50. He retired from hockey in 1951. In 1973 he became a charter member of the United States Hockey Hall of Fame

LoPresti married his wife Carol in 1941, and operated a tavern in Eveleth following his playing career. His son Pete was also an NHL goaltender, making him and Sam the first father-son goaltenders in NHL history.

== Death ==
LoPresti died of a heart attack at his home in Eveleth, Minnesota on December 11, 1984.

== Career statistics ==
=== Regular season and playoffs ===
			Regular season								Playoffs
Season	Team	League	GP	W	L	T	Min	GA	SO	GAA	GP	W	L	Min	GA	SO	GAA
1936–37	Eveleth Rangers	TBSHL	2	—	—	—	120	9	0	4.50	—	—	—	—	—	—	—
1937–38	St. Paul Saints	AHA	48	10	36	2	2952	178	2	3.62	—	—	—	—	—	—	—
1938–39	St. Paul Saints	AHA	44	23	21	0	2684	122	1	2.73	3	0	3	180	11	0	3.67
1939–40	St. Paul Saints	AHA	47	29	18	0	2848	121	4	2.55	7	6	1	420	9	2	1.29
1940–41	Kansas City Americans	AHA	18	9	9	0	1142	61	0	3.21	—	—	—	—	—	—	—
1940–41	Chicago Black Hawks	NHL	27	9	15	3	1670	84	1	3.02	5	2	3	344	12	0	2.10
1941–42	Chicago Black Hawks	NHL	47	21	23	3	2870	152	3	3.19	3	1	2	187	5	1	1.60
1946–47	Duluth Coolerators	TBSHL	4	—	—	—	240	30	0	7.50	—	—	—	—	—	—	—
1949–50	Eveleth Rangers	AAHL	30	17	13	0	1800	114	0	3.79	—	—	—	—	—	—	—
1950–51	Eveleth Rangers	AAHL	20	—	—	—	1200	99	0	4.98	—	—	—	—	—	—	—
NHL totals			74	30	38	6	4520	236	4	3.12	8	3	5	531	17	1	1.92

== See also ==
- List of people who disappeared mysteriously at sea
