= Elcor, Minnesota =

Ghost town in Minnesota, United States

Elcor
- Ghost town
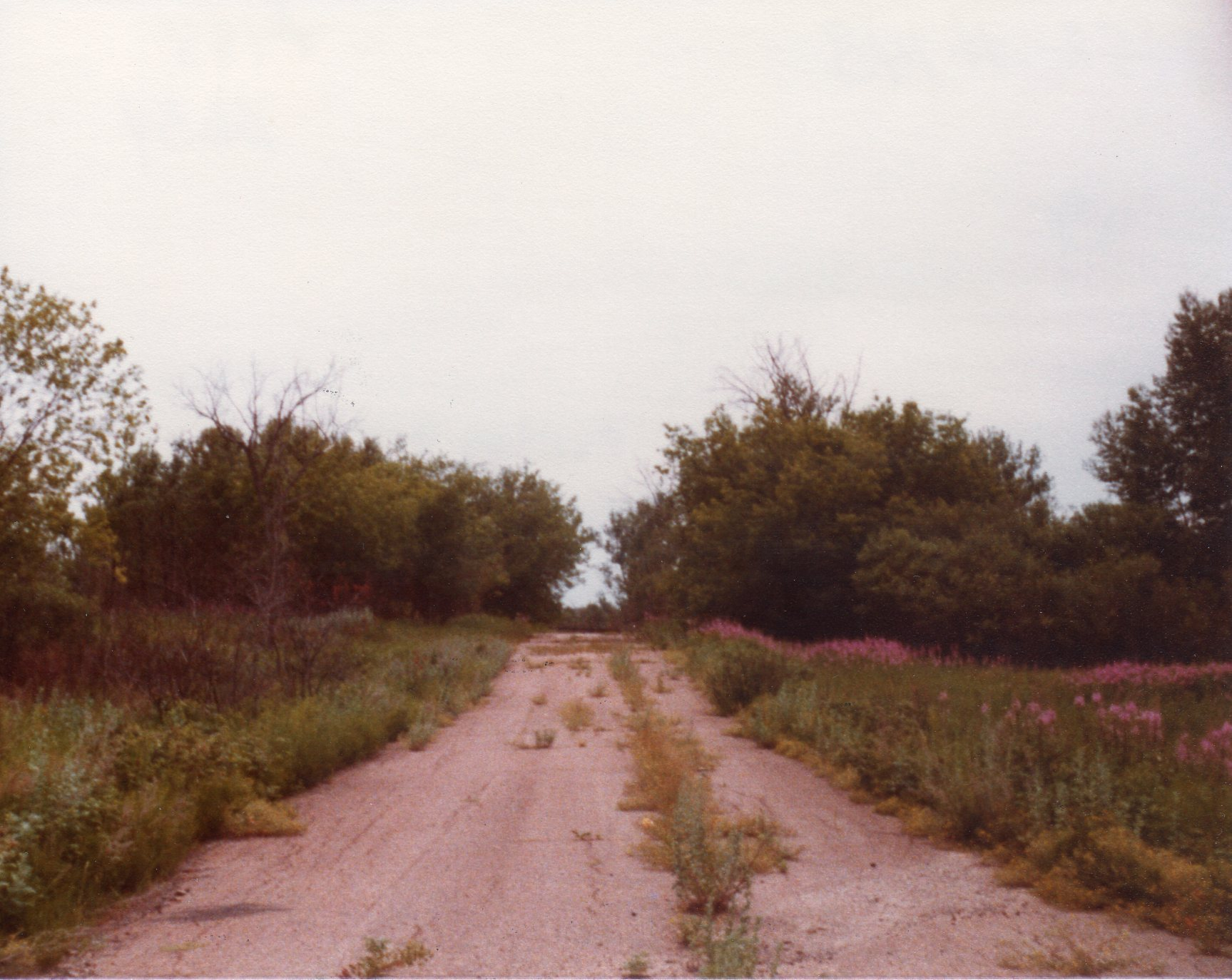
- Maritana Avenue, one of only two paved roads in Elcor, looking south toward Manilla Street, 1980

- Location within Minnesota Location within the United States
- Coordinates: 47°30′19″N 92°26′28″W
- Country: United States
- State: Minnesota
- County: St. Louis
- Elevation: 1,542 ft (470 m)

Population (2024)
  - Total: 0
- Time zone: UTC-6 (Central (CST))
  - Summer (DST): UTC-5 (CDT)
- Area code: 218
- GNIS feature ID: 661197

Elcor is a ghost town, or more properly, an extinct town, in the U.S. state of Minnesota that was inhabited between 1897 and 1956. It was built on the Mesabi Iron Range near the city of Gilbert in St. Louis County. Elcor was its own unincorporated community before it was abandoned and was never a neighborhood proper of the city of Gilbert. Not rating a figure in the national census, the people of Elcor were only generally considered to be citizens of Gilbert. The area where Elcor was located was annexed by Gilbert when its existing city boundaries were expanded after 1969.

In November 1890, the seven Merritt brothers discovered ore near Mountain Iron, triggering an unparalleled iron rush to the Mesabi Range. The Elba mine was opened in 1897, and the town was platted under the direction of Don H. Bacon, president of the Minnesota Iron Company. A second nearby mine, the Corsica, was opened in 1901. The community was first called "Elba" after the name of the first underground mine (the name "Elcor" was formed later by combining the first syllables of each mine's name). The Elba and Corsica mines were both leased by Pickands Mather and Company after the formation of the United States Steel Corporation. An influx of people of many ethnicities and many nations followed, and Elcor became a microcosm of U.S. immigration, mirroring the cultural assimilation of the time. At its peak around 1920, Elcor had two churches, a post office, a general store, a primary school, a railroad station, and its own law enforcement, and housed a population of nearly 1,000.

Elcor was a mining location, built by the mining company to house the workers for its mines. People were allowed to own their homes, but the land on which the houses stood belonged to the mining company. After the Corsica mine closed in 1954, Pickands Mather and Company ordered the residents to vacate the property so that it could reclaim the land; by 1956, Elcor was completely abandoned. The desolate property changed hands often through acquisitions, mergers, and bankruptcies. In 1993, the Inland Steel Company began stockpiling the overburden from what is now the Minorca Mine over Elcor's former location.

== History ==
=== Establishment ===
Elcor came into existence with the opening of the Elba mine in 1897 and ended with the closing of the Corsica mine in 1954. The town was originally known as Elba, between the present-day cities of McKinley and Gilbert; the name "Elcor" was chosen later, by combining the first syllable of the name of each mine. As an Iron Range mining location, Elcor originally consisted of a grid of houses the mining company rented to its employees. It was one of over 125 mining locations, nearly 50 of which existed between the present-day cities of Eveleth and Aurora. Some of these, like Sparta and Pineville, exist today; others, such as Franklin and Genoa, have been annexed by adjacent communities; most have disappeared entirely.

Development of the Elba mine was carried out by the Minnesota Iron Company, and the first shipment of ore was made in 1898. The Minnesota Iron Company also had a controlling interest in Petit and Robinson, which owned the Corsica mine, where the first ore was shipped in 1901. Don H. Bacon, who joined the Minnesota Iron Company as general manager in 1887 and eventually became its president, was an ardent traveler who named many mines after Mediterranean islands, including Malta, Maiorica, Corsica, and Elba. He had a penchant for names beginning with the letter M. The Minnesota Steamship Company was organized by, and vertically integrated with, the Minnesota Iron Company to carry ore in 1889; its steamers and barges all had names that began with M, and the ships were referred to as the M fleet. Elba's street and avenue names also all began with M:

Elcor townsite plat, c. 1921–1926

Mohawk Street
Malta Street
Manilla Street (this was also the main street)
Manola Street
Mariposa Avenue
Mauna Loa Avenue
Maritana Avenue
Minorca Avenue

The first street in Elba was Manilla Street. Company houses were constructed on both sides of it.

The Elba group of mines was between 1 and 1.5 miles west of McKinley, and was usually classed with the McKinley district mines, which included the Elba and Corsica mines, the La Belle mine, operated by the Pitt Iron Mining Company, the McKinley mine, operated by the Oliver Iron Mining Company, and the Roberts mine, operated by the Bowe-Burke Mining Company. The Minnesota Iron Company operated the Elba mine from 1898 to 1900 under the direction of M. E. McCarthy. Immediately after the formation of the United States Steel Corporation in 1901, Pickands Mather and Company acquired the Elba and Corsica mines, assuming the mineral leases and operating both after that date. Owners James Pickands, Samuel Livingston Mather II and Jay Morse had been interested in the Corsica iron-ore properties for some time, and the mines remained on the firm's shipping roll for many years. William Philip Chinn was appointed superintendent of the Elba and adjacent Corsica mine under the new management of Pickands Mather and Company, succeeding McCarthy. Chinn was then on his way up in mining circles, ultimately becoming general manager of all Pickands Mather mining properties in the Lake Superior region in 1918; he was succeeded as superintendent of the Elba and Corsica mines by L. C. David. The Oliver Iron Mining Company also owned what they designated the "Elba No. 1 and No. 2 Reserve" ore bodies, but these were entirely different from the Elba and Corsica mines and remained undeveloped.

=== Peak years ===
The community grew at the beginning of the century. In 1902, the Corsica mine began operating in earnest and houses were quickly built. Company houses were built among the tall timbers. The community thrived on iron mining, its population nearing 1,000 after World War I, resulting in a neat and comfortable location comprising more than 100 houses. The townspeople were pioneers and largely immigrants, including Croatians, Slovenians, Finns, Italians, Germans, Scandinavians, and English, particularly from Cornwall.

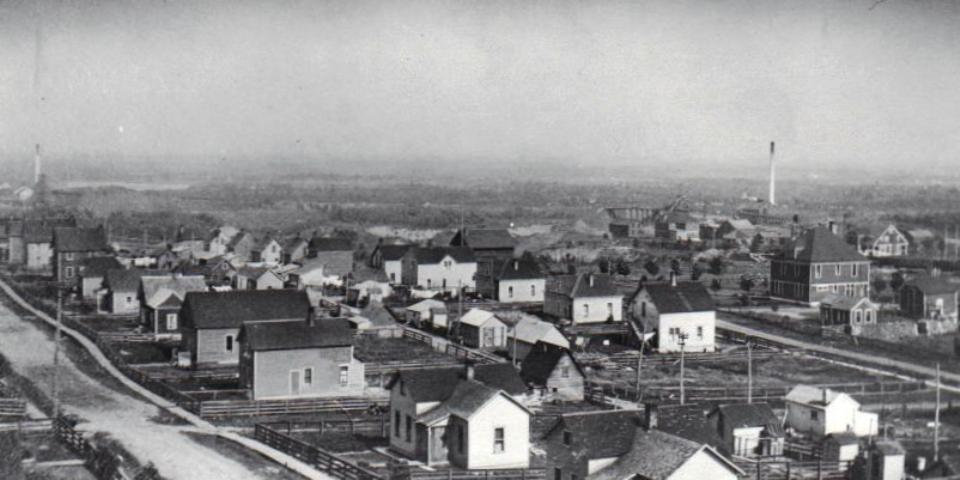
Elcor c. 1916, showing power lines, boardwalk, and four-board fences. The Corsica mine stack is farthest left

In the early days, houses were made of wooden boards and surrounded by a four-board-high fence which was fronted with a boardwalk. Most of the streets were dirt roads. Winters were bitterly cold, and teams of horses dragging V-shaped wooden plows cleared the streets. In the center of town was the community pump, from which the village would draw water at stipulated hours. Water was pumped from the mine twice a day through a big open pipe. Everyone had to carry water home during pumping time. There was no shutoff valve, so buckets, tubs, and barrels were used for water storage. Later, a water tower was built to hold water drawn from a deep well. St. Bernard dogs helped carry the water from the well to the homes. Running water and bathtubs came only after ditches were dug for pipes to provide water from Gilbert around 1916. Kerosene lamps provided the means of lighting until 1916, when power lines were installed. Initially, the only telephone was at the Elba mine office.

The community's Finns organized a temperance society and built the Finnish Temperance Hall. The community also included a band, a volunteer fire department, tennis courts, and a clubhouse for employees. A small Methodist church and Presbyterian church were built. The town also had a night watchman and later a full-time patrolman. Always noted as a quiet, orderly town, Elcor managed to avoid the social vagaries of adjacent communities, like Gilbert's red-light district.

One of the frame houses was used as the first school in Elcor. It was not long before a new school was constructed. Elcor was included in the middle part of the Gilbert School system, known then as Independent School District No. 18. There were five schoolhouses in the district. The McKinley-Elba school was built in 1900, halfway between McKinley and Elba, complete with its own well and windmill. It had four teachers and housed classes through the eighth grade, accommodating pupils of both communities. Students walked to school over boardwalks. There were also three primary schools in the district, one of them in Elba on Malta Street.

Elcor's renters were required to take in boarders. The company rented a "cottage" for $7.50 per month, which later included electricity. Homes were charged an additional dollar per month when water was piped in from Gilbert. Although people were later allowed to own their homes (even though the land on which the houses stood belonged to the mining company), rents were never increased.

All families had their own gardens in which they grew vegetables that lasted through the winter. Some raised cows, pigs, and chickens; others had horses for carrying firewood. There was little refrigeration, and perishables were difficult to keep. Before the Mercantile came to Elcor, residents went to the J. P. Ahlin store in McKinley, or to the Saari, Campbell and Kraker Mercantile in Gilbert. Deliveries were made daily, with orders taken for the following day. People bought on credit and paid monthly, on paydays.

In 1920, the Finnish Hall became a general store, the Elcor Mercantile, along with an official U.S. Post Office. When the post office began operation, much confusion resulted, because there was another town named Elba in southeastern Minnesota, just east of Rochester. The name "Corsica" was attempted with the same result. Finally, the community was named "Elcor", combining the first syllable of each of the two names. "Elcor" was emblazoned in large white letters on the water tower.

Mail was picked up twice daily at the railroad station, erroneously spelled "Elcore", for the Duluth and Iron Range Railroad (later the Duluth, Missabe and Iron Range Railroad). Later, the Elcor Mercantile diversified into the up-and-coming petroleum business, selling Conoco gasoline, kerosene, fuel oils, motor oils, grease, and even outboard motors. Concrete sidewalks were built to line the shady streets, and bright red fire hydrants were installed. Homes were insulated, and people began to purchase refrigerators. Manilla Street and Maritana Avenue were paved. Greyhound Bus Lines established a stop at the Elcor Mercantile. A baseball team was entered in the old East Mesaba League, and the Elcor Mercantile sponsored the Elcor-Conocos, an ice hockey team that became one of the best on the Iron Range. Chicago Blackhawks ice hockey goaltender Sam LoPresti was born in Elcor.

Aerial photo of Elcor in 1948, before its abandonment

The Corsica and Elba mines remained the chief source of employment until 1926, when the underground Elba mine closed. It had been mined out. A few years later, the Corsica mine was converted into an open pit, and the future of the town once again seemed secure. Then the Great Depression hit. In the fall of 1929, Corsica closed and stayed closed for many years, with only a few salaried people retained. The mine remained idle until 1940, ironically receiving an honorable mention in the National Safety Competition from the U.S. Bureau of Mines in 1934. Once World War II began, the mining business boomed again.

=== Abandonment ===
Aerial photo of Elcor in 1961, after abandonment

In 1954, the Corsica pit was shut down. Workers were told that the shutdown was temporary because the demand for that particular type of ore had declined. The pit was allowed to flood, and Pickands Mather officially conceded that "temporary" might stretch into quite a long time, although the mine would perhaps "eventually" be reopened. A year later, Pickands Mather and Company, manager of the mines at Elcor and the land on which the houses rested, ordered residents to vacate the property. By edict of the mining company, the remaining families were forced out so that the company could reclaim the land.

Sources differ on why the order was issued, speculating that the company wanted the land for a dump site, no longer wanted to tend to the town's maintenance, or decided it was not economical to own houses anymore. No one in authority revealed what was to become of the land.

Residents of the company-owned houses were given the option to buy the structures at bargain prices, provided they moved them out of town. For many, it took much of their life savings to relocate elsewhere, taking their homes in caravans along the highways and leaving behind empty foundations. Most Elcor residents purchased lots in the surrounding communities, trying to beat land speculators. In the few months after Elcor's fate became official, land prices skyrocketed. Lots that had originally been priced at $75 were sold for as much as $500. Most of the remaining families moved about two miles west to Gilbert, although other homes were replanted in nearby McKinley. The last vestiges of the old mining community were gone by 1956. Every building was torn down or removed. All that remained for some years after were old foundations, sidewalks, rusting stoves, pipes, bottles, and yard shrubbery, formerly visible from the old section of Minnesota State Highway 135 between Gilbert and Biwabik. A rusted fire hydrant adorned what was once a street corner, and a porcelain toilet bowl remained bolted to a concrete floor. An abandoned rail line for the Duluth, Missabe and Iron Range Railway went through what was left of the town site. Mine shafts were boarded up with old timbers. After everyone had left, the company dumped heaps of iron ore on the roads leading into Elcor, and in the process a ghost town was made out of what was once a thriving community.

Corsica mine smokestack before its demolition, c. 1967

For a time, the only landmark that remained at the old mining location was a 200-foot (61 m) smokestack near the defunct Corsica mine. The stack, built by Cornish miners in 1901, had a unique design. The Iron Range Historical Society wanted the stack, the last of its kind on the Mesabi Iron Range, to be preserved as an off-premises attraction, since it was structurally sound and historically significant, but its demolition had already been contracted as a part of the Minnesota Mineland Reclamation Act Abandoned Minelands Cleanup Program. Many people feared it might fall and injure someone; others considered it an aerial obstruction. In 1976, the stack was destroyed; it took three blasting attempts and nearly 100 pounds (45 kg) of dynamite to bring the structure down. After the demolition, responsibility for the land on which Elcor stood changed hands on several different occasions. As early as 1978, the property and its management were acquired by the Jones and Laughlin Steel Company. Property rights were then transferred to LTV Steel after the merger of Jones and Laughlin with Republic Steel in 1984. Property rights were later acquired by the Inland Steel Company in a transfer from LTV. In 1993, Inland Steel began stripping the overburden near the old town site, and the Laurentian mine was born. After the acquisition of Inland Steel by Mittal in 1998, the mine was acquired by ArcelorMittal in the 2006 merger of Arcelor with Mittal Steel, and redesignated the Laurentian pit of the Minorca mine. In 2020, Cleveland-Cliffs acquired the United States operations of ArcelorMittal, essentially bringing ownership of the property full-circle back to Pickands Mather and Company, the iron and coal mining businesses of which were purchased by Cleveland-Cliffs in 1986.

== Geology ==
Elcor sat atop a bed of taconite consisting of a uniform mixture of about 30 percent iron, interspersed with pockets of high-grade ore containing 90 to 95 percent iron, a part of the Biwabik iron formation. The formation is a large sheet of iron-bearing sediment deposited during the Precambrian era on the bottom of the Animikie Sea. This sea occupied the western portion of the Great Lakes area, depositing iron-bearing sediments extending under Lake Superior from the Mesabi and Vermilion Iron Ranges in northern Minnesota, to the Gogebic Iron Range in northern Wisconsin and Michigan's upper peninsula, to the Marquette Range of the upper peninsula, and west to the manganese-rich ore of the Cuyuna Iron Range in central Minnesota. Michigan's silicious steel-blue high-grade ores were quite different from the Mesabi ore, which was hydrated soft brown hematite. Geologists disagree about the geologic time period of the region and the mechanism by which the iron-bearing sediment was laid down differently on opposite sides of the lake. There is iron ore in other areas of Minnesota, but no longer in quantities that are practical to mine.

Geologists divide the iron-bearing rocks of the eastern Mesabi Iron Range into several layers. In the stratigraphic column, Virginia Slate and Duluth gabbro lie above, followed by four main iron-bearing divisions named the Upper Slaty, Upper Cherty, Lower Slaty, and Lower Cherty. Below these are quartzite and granite. Beneath the shallow topsoil measuring less than 20 feet (6 m) deep, the slate is from 50 feet (15 m) to several hundred feet thick, and the four iron-bearing layers are from 400 to 600 feet (120 to 180 m) thick.

== Geography and climate ==
Elcor lay at an elevation of 1,542 feet (470 m) in St. Louis County, Minnesota, 52 miles (84 km) north-northwest of Duluth. The nearest cities to Elcor were Gilbert, approximately 2 miles (3 km) to the southwest and McKinley, approximately 2 miles (3 km) to the east-northeast. Elcor was along the old section of Minnesota State Highway 135, almost 5 miles (8 km) east-southeast of U.S. Route 53 and about 2 miles (3 km) northeast of Minnesota State Highway 37.

Elcor was in the Laurentian Mixed Forest Province in the Arrowhead region of northern Minnesota. The polar air mass dominates this part of the state year-round. The Köppen climate classification is Dfb. Precipitation ranges from about 21 inches (53 cm) annually along the western border of the forest to about 32 inches (81 cm) at its eastern edge. Average annual temperatures are about 34 °F (1 °C) along the northern part of the forest, rising to 40 °F (4 °C) at its southern extreme. Normal annual snowfall totals about 60 inches (150 cm).

July is the warmest month, when the average high temperature is 78 °F (26 °C) and the average low is 51 °F (11 °C). January is the coldest, with an average high temperature of 18 °F (−8 °C) and average low of −5 °F (−21 °C). Elcor was approximately 22 miles (35 km) south-southwest of Tower, Minnesota, where the temperature reached a record low of −60 °F (−51 °C) on February 2, 1996.

== See also ==
- Iron Range
- List of ghost towns in the United States

== Sources ==
- Appleby, William (1920). Mining Directory of Minnesota for 1920. Minneapolis: University of Minnesota. OCLC 1465786. Archived from the original on June 9, 2021.
- Crowell; Murray (1914). The Iron Ores of Lake Superior: Containing Some Facts of Interest Relating to Mining and Shipping of the Ore and Location of Principal Mines, with Original Maps of the Ranges. Cleveland: Penton Publishing Company. p. 229. ISBN 9781298644831. "steel blue hard iron ore vs. soft red iron ore."
- Davis, Edward Wilson (1964). Pioneering with Taconite. St. Paul, MN: Minnesota Historical Society. ISBN 978-0-87351-496-5. Archived from the original on June 9, 2021.
- Gilbert Centennial. Gilbert, MN: Iron Range Historical Society. 2008. OCLC 946919644.
- Havinghurst, Walter (1958). Vein of Iron: The Pickands-Mather Story. Cleveland and New York: World Publishing Company. ASIN B0007DMAS0. Archived from the original on June 9, 2021.
- Lamppa, Marvin (1962). Ghost Towns and Locations of the Vermilion and East Mesabi Mining Districts (MA thesis). University of Minnesota. OCLC 19474669.
- Leighton, Hudson (1998). Gazetteer of Minnesota Railroad Towns, 1861–1997. Roseville, MN: Park Genealogical Books. ISBN 978-0-915709-61-8. Archived from the original on June 9, 2021.
- Phillipich, Leonard; et al. (1982). Elba-Elcor Reunion 1897–1956 'A Collection of Memories'. Gilbert, MN: Elcor Reunion Committee. OCLC 9063479.
- Upham, Warren (2001). Minnesota Place Names: A Geographical Encyclopedia (Third ed.). St. Paul, MN: Minnesota Historical Society. ISBN 978-0-87351-396-8. Archived from the original on June 9, 2021.
- Van Brunt, Walter (1921). History of Duluth and St. Louis County; Their Story and People. Vol. 1. Chicago and New York: American Historical Society. ISBN 978-1-278-95208-6. Archived from the original on June 9, 2021.
- Van Hise, Charles Richard; United States Geological Survey (1901). The Iron-Ore Deposits of the Lake Superior Region (Second ed.). Washington: Government Printing Office. ISBN 978-1277081183. Archived from the original on June 9, 2021.
- Woodbridge, Dwight Edwards; Pardee, John Stone (1910). History of Duluth and St. Louis County, Past and Present. Vol. 1. Chicago: C.F. Cooper & Company. ISBN 978-1-235-82910-9. Archived from the original on June 9, 2021.
