= Laura Gardin Fraser =

American sculptor (1889-1966)

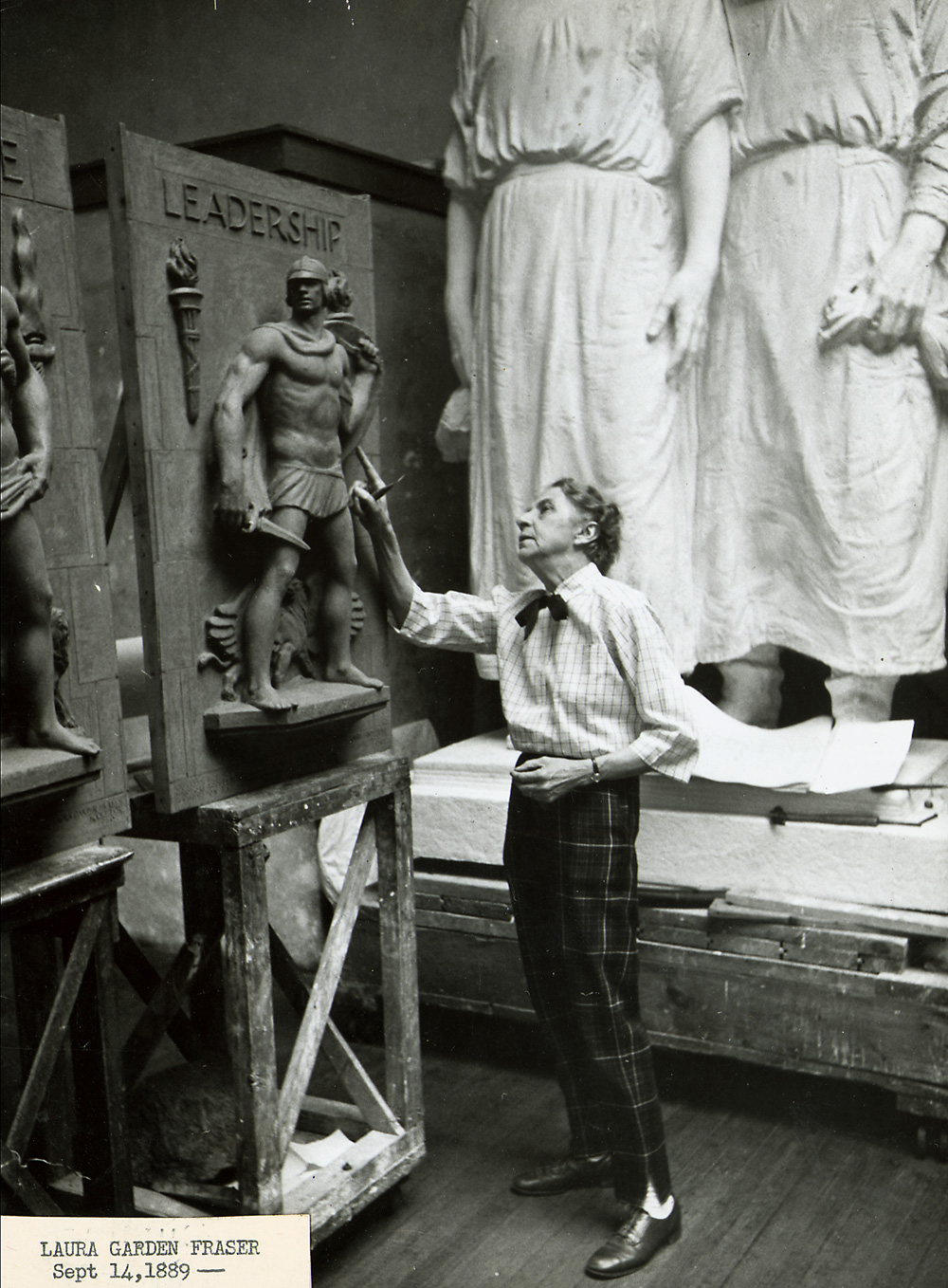
- Born: September 14, 1889; Chicago, Illinois, U.S.
- Died: August 13, 1966 (aged 76); Norwalk, Connecticut, U.S.
- Education: Columbia University

Laura Gardin Fraser (September 14, 1889 – August 13, 1966) was an American sculptor. She was married to sculptor James Earle Fraser and was a first cousin of painter Agnes Pelton.

Laura Gardin studied under Fraser at the Art Students League of New York from 1910 to 1912. Alone or with her husband she designed a number of U.S. coins, notably the 1921 Alabama Centennial half dollar, the 1922 Grant Memorial half dollar, the 1925 Fort Vancouver Centennial half dollar, and the 1926 Oregon Trail Memorial half dollar.

In 1931 she was the winner of the competition to design a new quarter with George Washington on the obverse. Her winning design was not selected by the then-Treasury Secretary, Andrew Mellon, who selected a design by John Flanagan. Fraser's design was coined as a commemorative five-dollar gold piece in 1999, to commemorate the 200th anniversary of George Washington's death. From 2022 to 2025, the design will be used for the American Women quarters series that celebrates prominent American women. In 1924, she was elected into the National Academy of Design as an Associate member, and became a full academician in 1931.

== Early life and education ==
Gardin was born on September 14, 1889, in Chicago, the daughter of John Emil and Alice Tilton Gardin She received her elementary education in Morton Park schools. Laura attended school in Rye, New York, then Wadleigh and the Horace Mann School in New York City. She graduated from the latter in the class of 1907. At an early age she had shown an aptitude in modeling figures and working in clay, a talent she developed under the guidance of her mother, who was an artist.

After high school, Laura studied at Columbia University briefly, then enrolled for work at the Art Students' League. It was during her years at the League that she met and studied under James Earle Fraser, whom she later married.

== Career ==
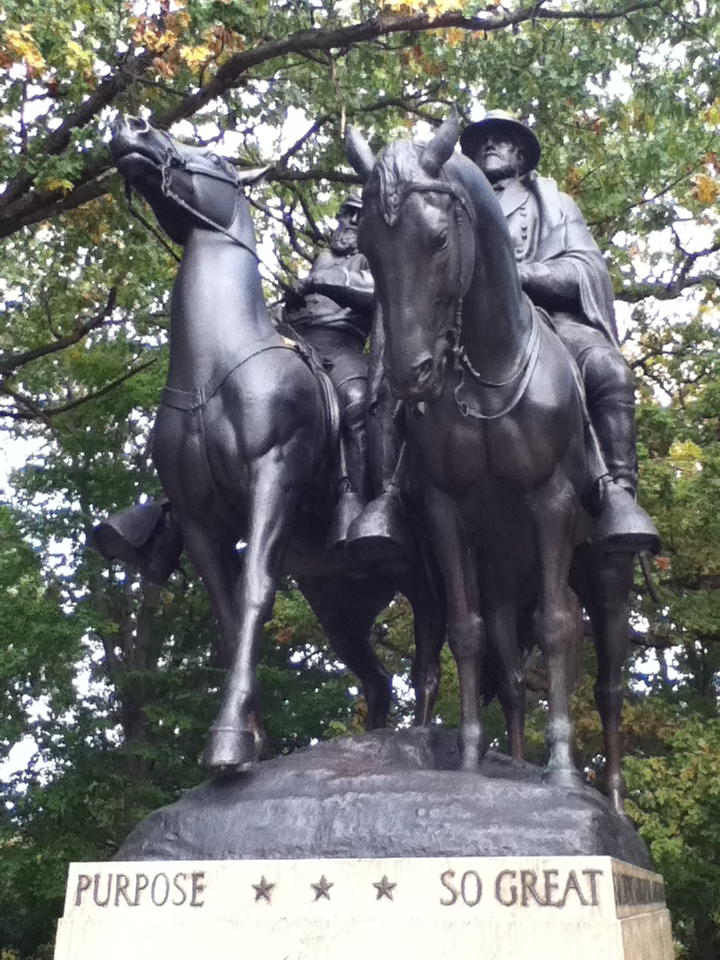
The Stonewall Jackson and Robert E. Lee Monument

Although recognized principally for her medallic contributions, Laura won outstanding commissions for heroic-size sculpture. Of these, the most notable was her winning the competition for a double equestrian statue of Generals Robert E. Lee and Stonewall Jackson in Baltimore. The competition was held in 1936 and six eminent American sculptors, Lee Lawrie, Paul Manship, Edward McCartan, Hans Schuler, Frederick William Sievers and Laura Fraser were invited to submit designs. Fraser was the only woman sculptor invited to enter the competition. Her work was also part of the art competitions at the 1928 Summer Olympics and the 1932 Summer Olympics.

In January 2016, a task force looking into Confederate monuments in Baltimore recommended that the monument to Jackson and Lee, along with a statue of Chief Justice of the Supreme Court Roger B. Taney, be removed. The commissioners recommended that the sculpture of Jackson and Lee be offered to the U.S. Park Service for installation in Chancellorsville, Virginia. The two Confederate generals last met in person shortly before the Battle of Chancellorsville in 1863. The sculpture was removed in the early hours of August 16, 2017, by the City of Baltimore, in reaction to the unrest in Charlottesville, Virginia a few days prior. The future of this sculpture is undecided as the city tries to find a new home for it.

== Death ==
Fraser died on August 13, 1966, in Norwalk, Connecticut, at age 76. She is buried next to her husband in Willowbrook Cemetery in Westport, Connecticut.
