= Longyear Drill Site =

- E.J. Longyear First Diamond Drill Site
- U.S. National Register of Historic Places
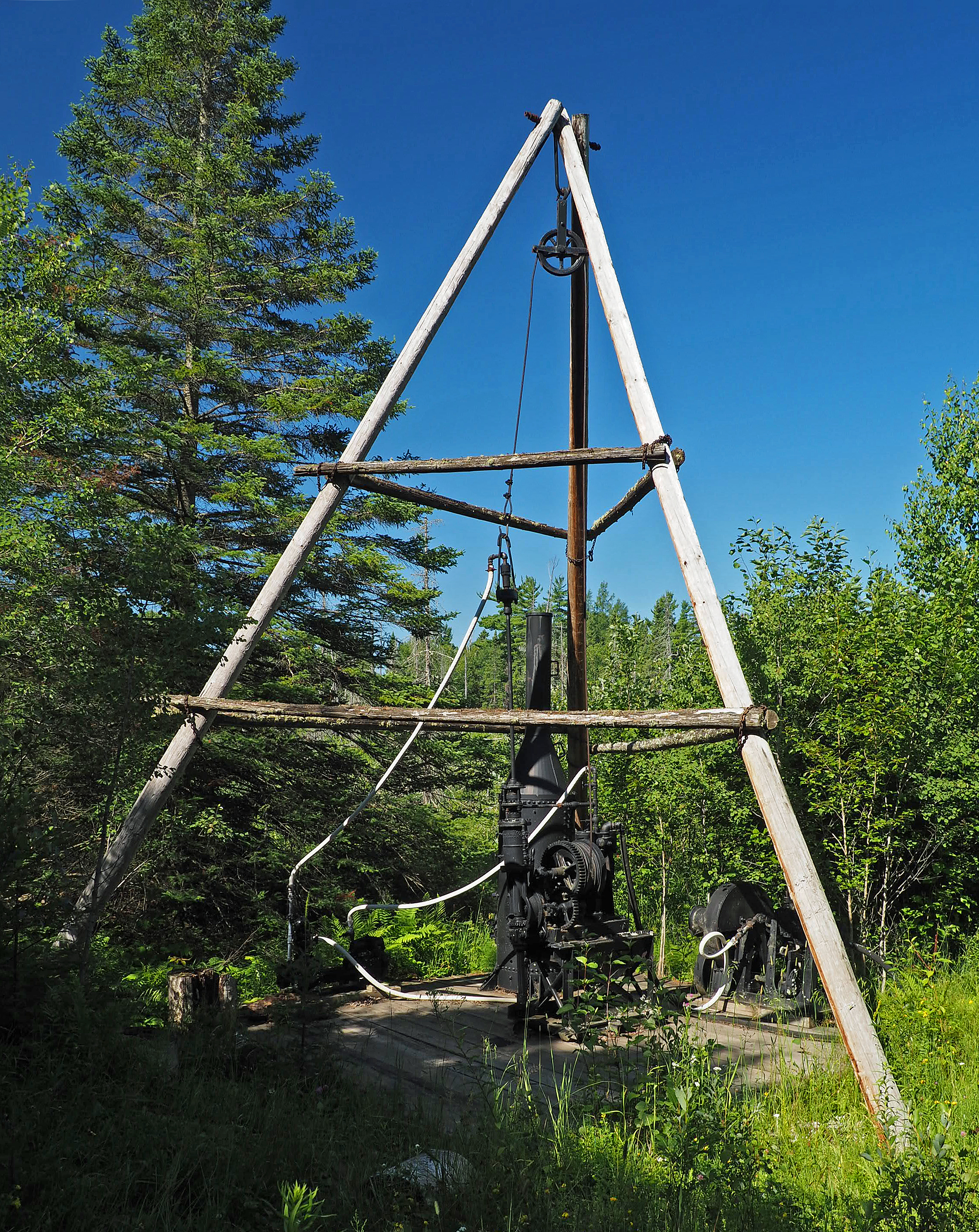
- Replica drill rig at the E.J. Longyear First Diamond Drill Site

- Location within Minnesota Location within the United States
- Location: 6500 County Road 666, Hoyt Lakes, Minnesota
- Coordinates: 47°33′27″N 92°7′0″W
- Area: Less than one acre
- Built: 1890
- Architect: Edmund J. Longyear
- NRHP reference No.: 77001526
- Added to NRHP: July 20, 1977

The Longyear Drill Site is a historic mineral exploration site in Hoyt Lakes, Minnesota, United States. In 1890 the first core samples were taken there from what would become known as the Mesabi Range, one of the world's richest iron ore deposits. The exploration diamond drilling process was led by Edmund J. Longyear, who went on to drill 7,100 test pits all across the Mesabi Range. In 1976 the Iron Range Historical Society developed the site as a historic attraction with period drilling equipment. It is now managed by the city of Hoyt Lakes in partnership with the Iron Range Historical Society (McKinley, Minnesota) volunteers and other volunteers.

In 1977 the site was listed as the E.J. Longyear First Diamond Drill Site on the National Register of Historic Places for its state-level significance in the themes of engineering and industry. It was nominated for its association with the beginning of a mining industry pivotal to the history of Minnesota and the United States.

== See also ==
- National Register of Historic Places listings in St. Louis County, Minnesota
