= Confederate Women's Monument =

Monument in Baltimore, Maryland, U.S.

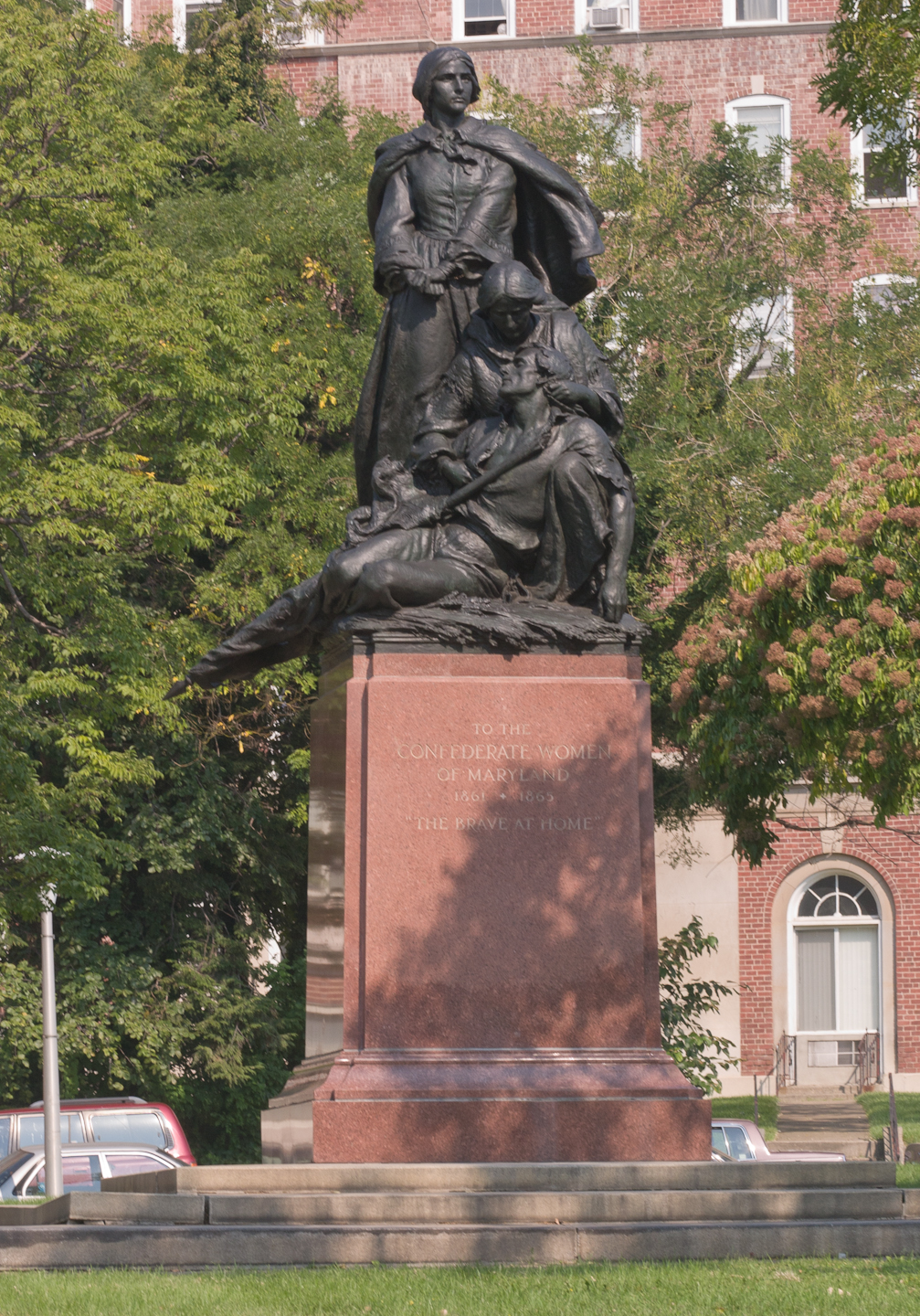
- The monument in 2008
- Artist: J. Maxwell Miller
- Year: 1917; 2017: removed
- Medium: Bronze sculpture
- Location: Baltimore, Maryland, U.S.
- Owner: City of Baltimore

The Confederate Women's Monument was an outdoor memorial by J. Maxwell Miller, installed in Baltimore, in the U.S. state of Maryland in 1917.

The statue was removed in August 2017. At the August 14, 2017, City Council session, they also voted unanimously to remove the Stonewall Jackson and Robert E. Lee Monument, the Confederate Soldiers and Sailors Monument and the Roger B. Taney Sculpture.

== See also ==
- List of Confederate monuments and memorials
- List of public art in Baltimore
- Memorial to Women of the Confederacy, Richmond, Virginia
- Removal of Confederate monuments and memorials
