= Arthur Quartley =

American painter

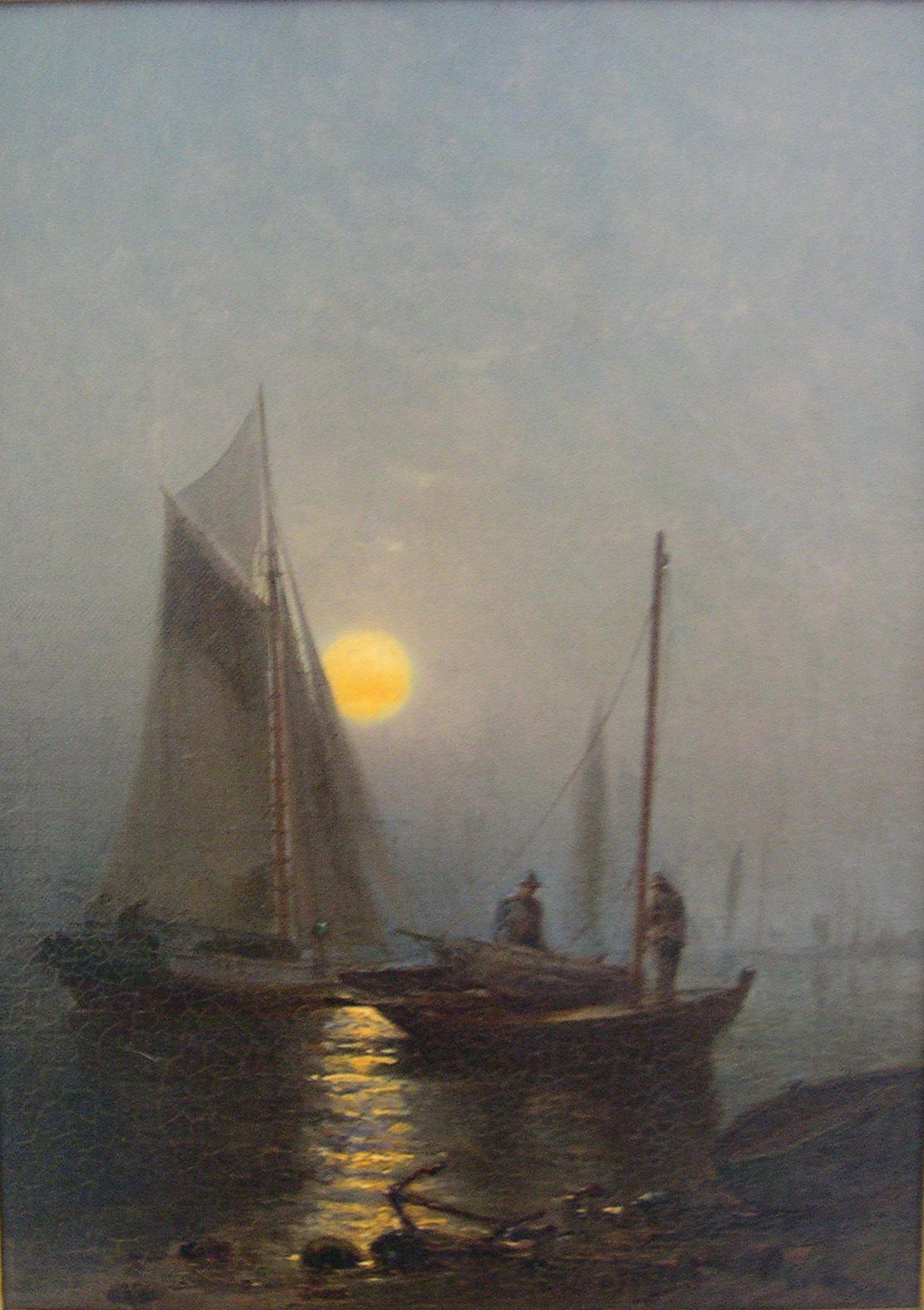
- Early Moonlight Naragansett Bay 1877. Source: Collection of C. Michael Hogan, Sonoma Valley, Ca.
- Born: May 24, 1839; Paris, France
- Died: May 19, 1886 (aged 46)
- Known for: Painting

Arthur Quartley (May 24, 1839 – May 19, 1886) was an American painter known for his marine seascapes.

== Biography ==
Quartley was born in Paris and lived there to the age of twelve, when his family moved to Baltimore, Maryland. He studied drawing with his father Frederick William Quartley, who was an English engraver. His father was reputed to have demanded two drawings per week from the young lad. At age 17, Arthur was apprenticed to a sign painter in Baltimore.

In 1852 Quartley and his family left Paris for New York City and in 1862, founded a design firm in Baltimore. The firm Emmart & Quartley was regarded as the best decorating company in the city (Dictionary of American Biography); however, young Quartley began painting marine seascapes of Chesapeake Bay, and progressively spent more and more time in that pursuit. He held a successful show of marine paintings at the studio of Norval H. Busey in Baltimore. Scholar Elizabeth Johns remarked that Quartley's work reveals familiarity with the Dutch Masters marine tradition of composition in treatment of light and color.

To pursue his painting more seriously, Quartley moved to New York City in 1875. New York at that time had become a premier center for notable painters. From there he painted seascapes of Long Island bays, New York Harbor, the New Hampshire Isle of Shoals, and Naragansett Bay in Rhode Island.

The Hudson River School was waning at this point, so that other groups were forming, among them the Tilers, of whom Quartley was a founding member. The Tilers was a group of artists and writers, that included Winslow Homer, William Merritt Chase, and Augustus Saint Gaudens. They met frequently to exchange ideas and decorate ceramic tiles in promotion of their works. They also took excursions for painting, such as the 1878 pilgrimage to Eastern Long Island by Quartley and ten others. On that trip Quartley painted Seascape and also a blue painted tile of an introspective girl at the beach. The journalist and philanthropist John W. McCoy promoted the careers of Quartley and of his friend, the sculptor William H. Rinehart.

In the year 1876 Quartley was elected to the National Academy. Quartley's prominence during his lifetime is illustrated by his inclusion as one of 68 painters in the publication American Painters (1880). Some of his noteworthy canvases are: Early Moonlight, Naragansett Bay (1877); Afternoon in August, Coast of Maine (1878); and Low Country on the North Shore of Long Island (1881).
