= Confederate Soldiers and Sailors Monument (Baltimore) =

Monument in Baltimore, Maryland, U.S.

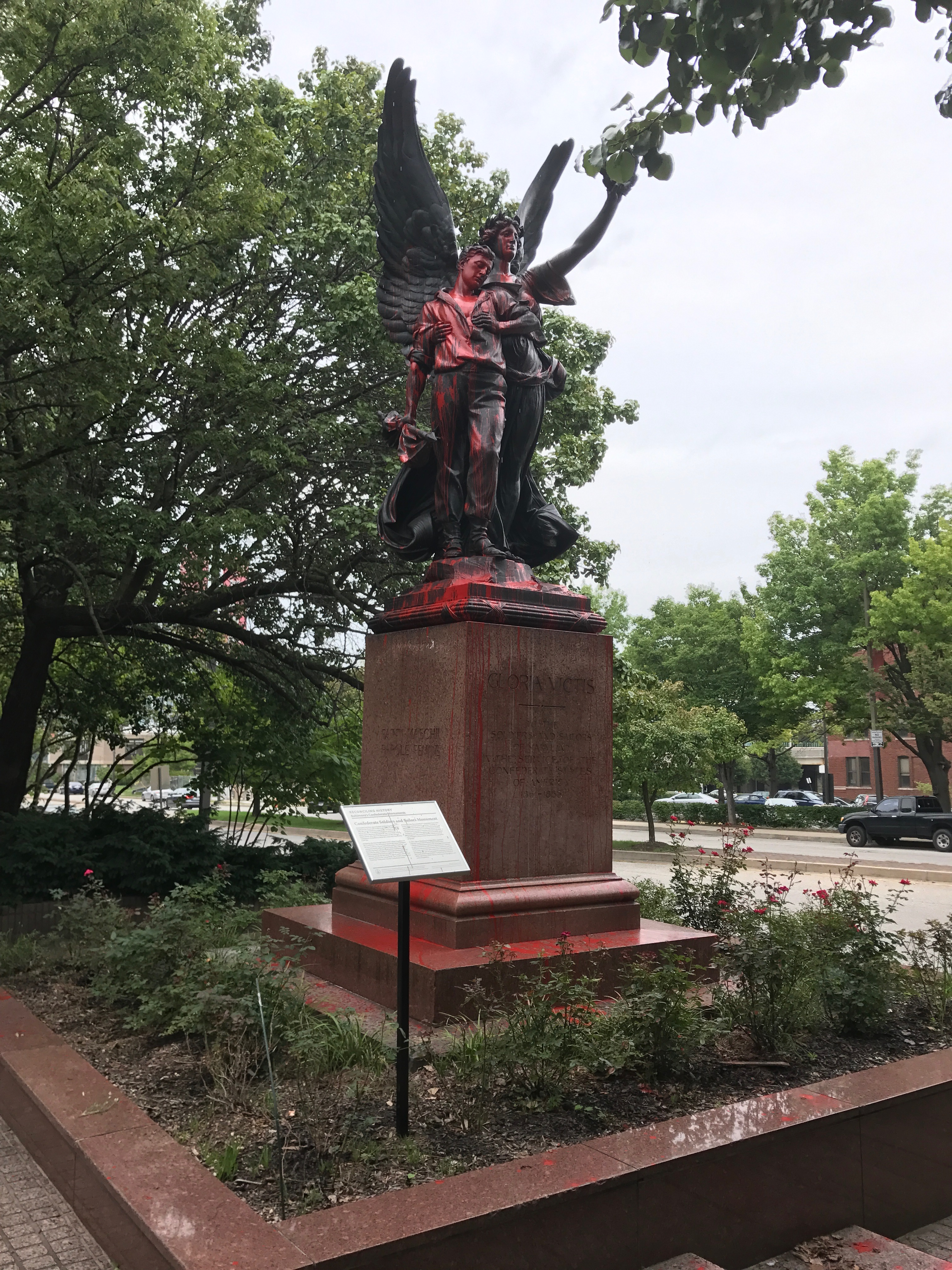
- The monument covered with red paint in August 2017
- Artist: Frederick Ruckstull
- Year: 1902; 2017: removed
- Medium: Bronze sculpture
- Location: Baltimore, Maryland, United States; 39°18′32″N 76°37′21″W
- Owner: City of Baltimore

The Confederate Soldiers and Sailors Monument was a monument in Baltimore, Maryland, installed in 1903 and removed in 2017.

== Description and history ==
The Maryland Daughters of the Confederacy raised money for the monument privately and commissioned a sculptor from New York City, F. Wellington Ruckstuhl to build it. The monument was dedicated on May 2, 1903.

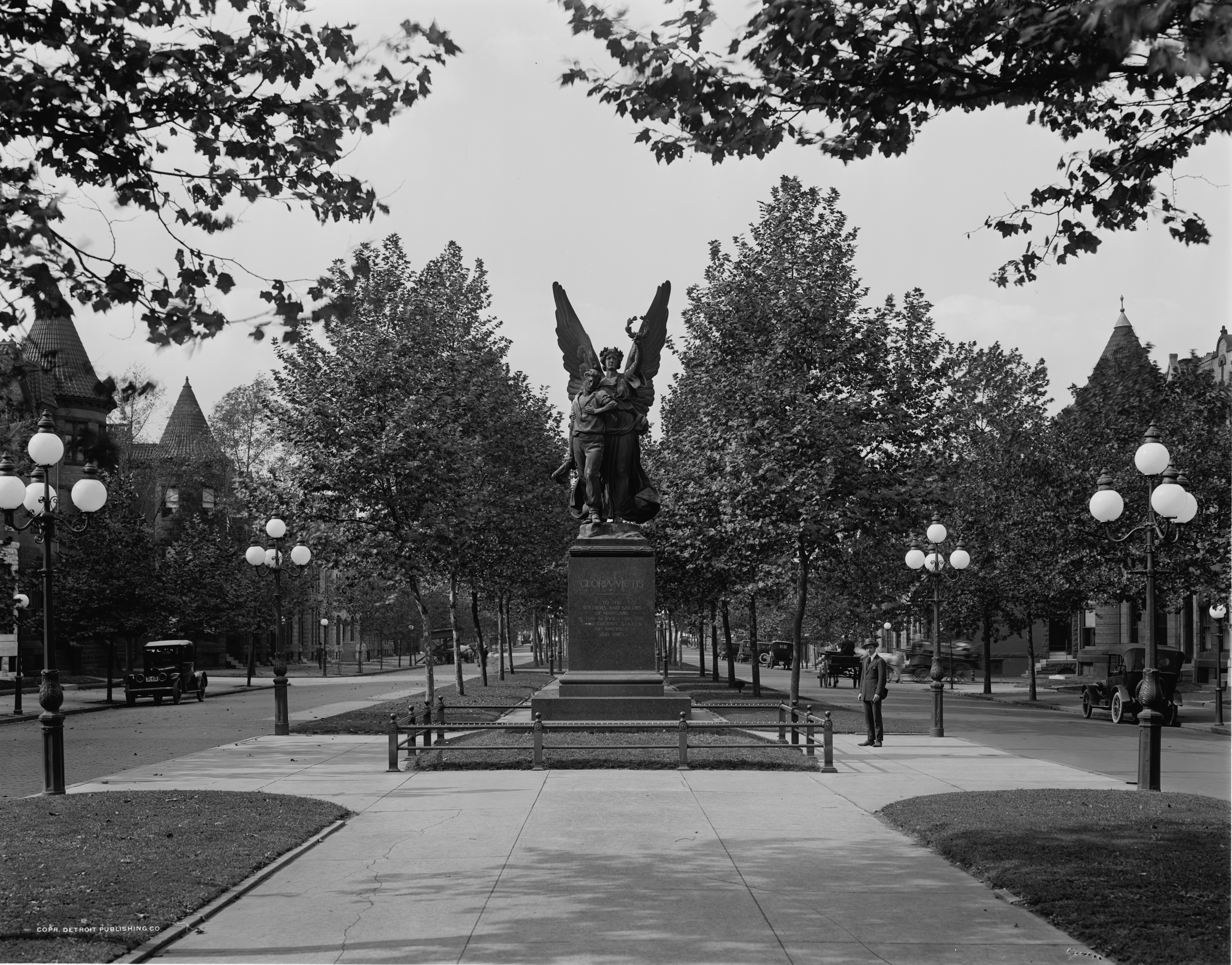
The monument in 1910

The statue shows Glory supporting a fallen soldier, his standard lowered but her wreath of History held high. The inscription at the base of the monument read, "GLORIA VICTIS", meaning "Glory to the Vanquished" and To The Soldiers and Sailors of Maryland in the Service of The Confederate States of America, 1861–1865. On the right side it read: "Deo vindice", on the left: "Fatti maschii, parole femine" and on the rear Glory Stands Beside Our Grief. Erected by the Maryland Daughters of the Confederacy, February 1903.

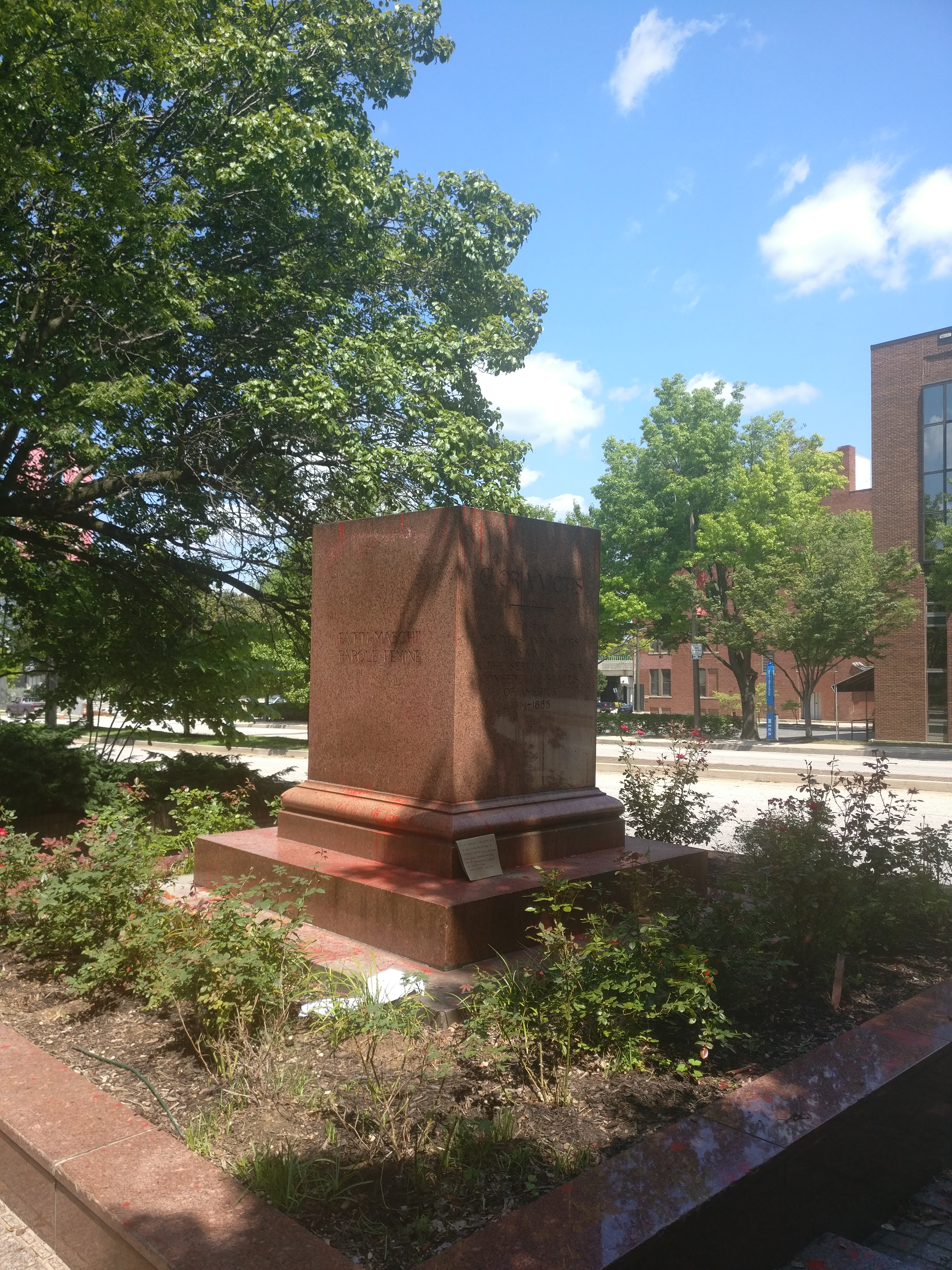
Pedestal after the removal of the monument

The monument was marked in June 2015, with "Black Lives Matter" scrawled across its side in the aftermath of the Charleston church shooting. In August 2017, its statue was covered with red paint. It was removed during the same month along with all other Confederate monuments in the city after the Baltimore City Council unanimously voted on August 14, 2017, to have it removed along with the Stonewall Jackson and Robert E. Lee Monument, the Roger B. Taney Sculpture, and the Confederate Women's Monument.

== See also ==
- List of Confederate monuments and memorials
- List of public art in Baltimore
- Removal of Confederate monuments and memorials
