= Iron Range Historical Society =

Organization collecting Iron Range history in Minnesota, USA

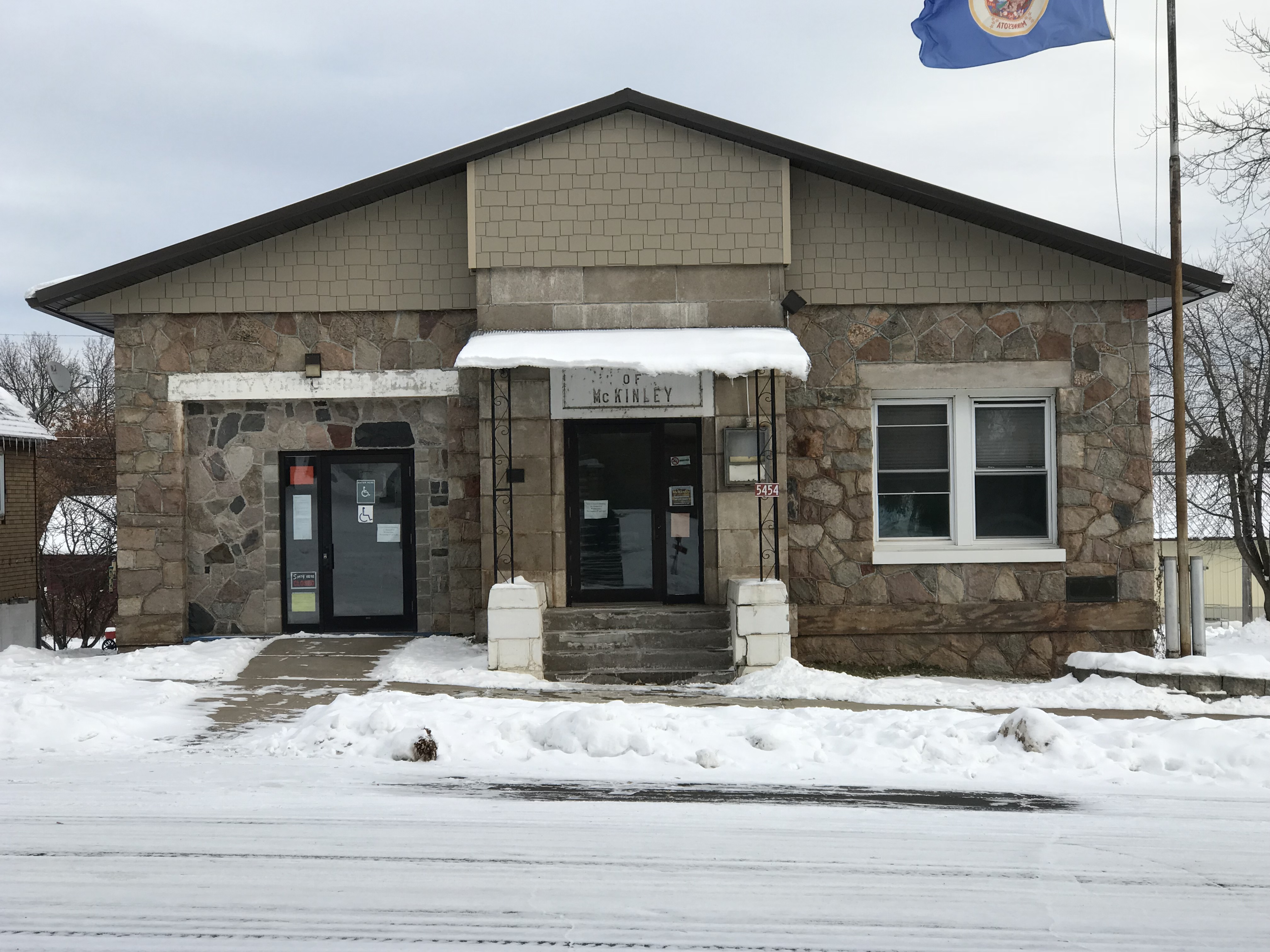
- The Iron Range Historical Society is located in the McKinley City Hall
- Established: 1973
- Location: 5454 Grand Avenue; McKinley, St. Louis County, Minnesota, USA
- Coordinates: 47°30′43.33″N 92°24′39.28″W
- Type: History
- Website: https://www.ironrangehistoricalsociety.org

The Iron Range Historical Society is a historical society that operates a research library in McKinley, Minnesota. The Society is a non-profit organization that exists through donations and volunteers. Its mission is "to collect, preserve, and share the history of Minnesota’s Iron Ranges for the benefit of future generations."

The Iron Range Historical Society was incorporated in 1973. Prior to moving to McKinley, the Society was located in Gilbert, Biwabik and Aurora.

The Iron Range Historical Society has a collection of more than 20,000 photographs in 90+ albums and old newspapers and city directories of people who lived in the larger Iron Range cities dating from 1899 until recent times. Additionally, the Society has Iron Range history books, photo displays, a few logging and mining artifacts, family and oral histories, local high school and college yearbooks, city and township anniversary books, Iron Range maps, limited vital records, mine records, some hospital records (with limited access), and personal documents.

The Iron Range Historical Society publishes four newsletters annually entitled Where History Comes Alive.

The Iron Range Historical Society made efforts in 1976 to save the last remaining smokestack at the Corsica Mine near Elcor, Minnesota. Architecturally significant, it was built by Cornish miners in 1901 and was the last of its kind on the Iron Range.

The Iron Range Historical Society is located in the McKinley City Hall at 5454 Grand Avenue in McKinley, Minnesota.
