= Virginia Slate =

Buckingham Slate is quarried in Buckingham County, Virginia, in the town of Arvonia. This natural stone has a distinct gray/blue/black color and glistens due to its mica content. One of the highest quality slates in the world, this unfading slate has long been used for architectural applications such as flooring, paving, wall cladding, stairs, counter tops, fireplace surrounds, gravestones and roofing. It has been used on countless prominent buildings and national landmarks, including The Dakota, Ford's Theatre, The Smithsonian Institution, The University of Virginia and Tuckahoe Plantation (the boyhood home of Thomas Jefferson).

As of 2019, two companies are active in quarrying and producing the slate from Buckingham County, Virginia: 1) Buckingham Slate Company, which was purchased in 2018 by Boxley Materials, a regional aggregates producer, and, 2) James River Slate Company which established quarry and mill operations in Arvonia in July 2013 and began marketing this stone as "Grayson Slate". James River Slate Company is a subsidiary of Vermont Structural Slate Company, a family owned and operated company based in Fair Haven, Vermont.
