= William Henry Rinehart =

American sculptor (1825–1874)

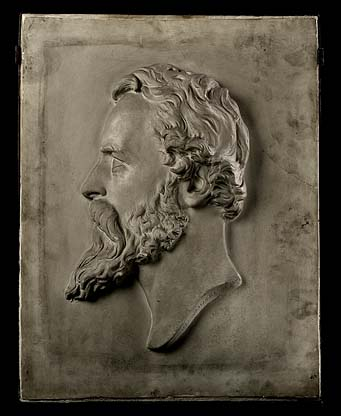
- Self-portrait relief bust (c. 1850–74).
- Born: September 13, 1825; Union Bridge, Maryland, U.S.
- Died: October 28, 1874 (aged 49); Rome, Italy
- Resting place: Green Mount Cemetery; Baltimore, Maryland, U.S.
- Education: Maryland Institute College of Art
- Known for: Sculpture
- Relatives: David Rinehart (brother)

William Henry Rinehart (September 13, 1825 – October 28, 1874) was an American sculptor. He is considered "the last important American sculptor to work in the classical style."

== Biography ==
The son of Israel Rinehart (1792–1871)and Mary (Snader) Rinehart (1797–1865), William Henry Rinehart was born in Union Bridge, Maryland. His brother was David Rinehart. He attended school until he was nearly eighteen. He then began to work on his father's farm, but also became the assistant of a stone-cutter in the neighborhood. In 1844 he began an apprenticeship in the stone-yard of Baughman and Bevan on the site of what is now the Peabody Institute in Baltimore, and studied sculpture at what is now called the Maryland Institute College of Art.

In 1855 Rinehart went to Italy to continue his studies. While there he executed two bas-reliefs in marble, Morning and Evening. On his return, two years later, he opened a studio in Baltimore, where he executed numerous busts, a fountain-figure for the main U.S. Post Office in Washington, DC; and two bronze figures, Backwoodsman and Indian, flanking the clock in the House of Representatives Chamber of the U.S. Capitol. In 1858 he settled in Rome where he would live the rest of his life, except for trips back to the United States in 1866 and 1872. Rinehart's burial was funded by his friends William Thompson Walters and Benjamin Franklin Newcomer and he was buried at Green Mount Cemetery in Baltimore.

== Legacy ==
Rinehart was financially successful in his lifetime, executing many commissions for wealthy and cultured clients. American patrons often traveled to Italy to meet Rinehart and plan projects for their estates back in America. Rinehart's most important patron and sponsor was William T. Walters, founder of Baltimore's Walters Art Gallery (now the Walters Art Museum).

William Henry Rinehart left his estate in trust for the teaching of sculpture at the Maryland Institute College of Art. In his name, MICA established the Rinehart School of Sculpture and a Rinehart fellowship. The Rinehart School's alumni would include the estimable Hans Schuler, born the year Rinehart died.

According to artcyclopedia.com and askart.com, Rinehart's sculptures, neoclassical in style and mostly of human figures, are in public collections such as those of the Metropolitan Museum of Art (New York City), the National Gallery of Art, (Washington, DC), the Walters Art Museum (Baltimore), the Museum of Fine Arts, Boston, the Brooklyn Museum of Art (New York City), the Carnegie Museum (Pittsburgh), and Ohio's Columbus Museum of Art, among others.

== Selected works ==
- Bas-reliefs of Morning and Evening (c. 1856), plaster, Smithsonian American Art Museum, Washington, D.C.
- Backwoodsman and Indian (1857), bronze, Monumental Clock, House of Representatives Chamber, U.S. Capitol. Now exhibited in the Capitol crypt.
- Sleeping Children (1859), marble, Smithsonian American Art Museum. At least 25 replicas in plaster and marble including one at the tomb of Hugh Sisson ("Marble King of Baltimore"), Green Mount Cemetery, Baltimore, Maryland.
- Woman of Samaria (1859–1862), marble, Walters Art Museum, Baltimore, Maryland.
- Leander (c. 1859), marble, Newark Museum, Newark, New Jersey. Marble replica (c. 1870) at Chrysler Museum of Art.
- Bust of Mrs. William T. Walters (1862), marble, Walters Art Museum, Baltimore, Maryland.
- Hero (modeled 1866), plaster, Smithsonian American Art Museum, Washington, D.C. At least 9 marble replicas.
- Antigone Pouring a Libation over the Corpse of Her Brother Polynices (modeled 1867–1870), plaster, Smithsonian American Art Museum, Washington, D.C. Marble replica(1870) at Metropolitan Museum of Art.
- Chief Justice Roger B. Taney (1867–1872), bronze, Maryland State House, Annapolis, Maryland. Bronze replica (1872) at Mount Vernon Place, Baltimore, Maryland. Both removed in 2017.
- Endymion (1868–1874), plaster, Smithsonian American Art Museum, Washington, D.C. Marble replica (c. 1874-1875) at National Gallery of Art, Washington D.C. Bronze replica at Rinehart's grave in Green Mount Cemetery, Baltimore, Maryland.
- Clytie (1872), marble, Baltimore Museum of Art. Marble replica (1872) at Metropolitan Museum of Art.
- Latona and Her Children – Apollo and Diana (modeled c. 1870–1872), plaster, Smithsonian American Art Museum, Washington, D.C. Marble replica (1874) at Metropolitan Museum of Art.
- Atalanta (1874), marble, Baltimore Museum of Art.
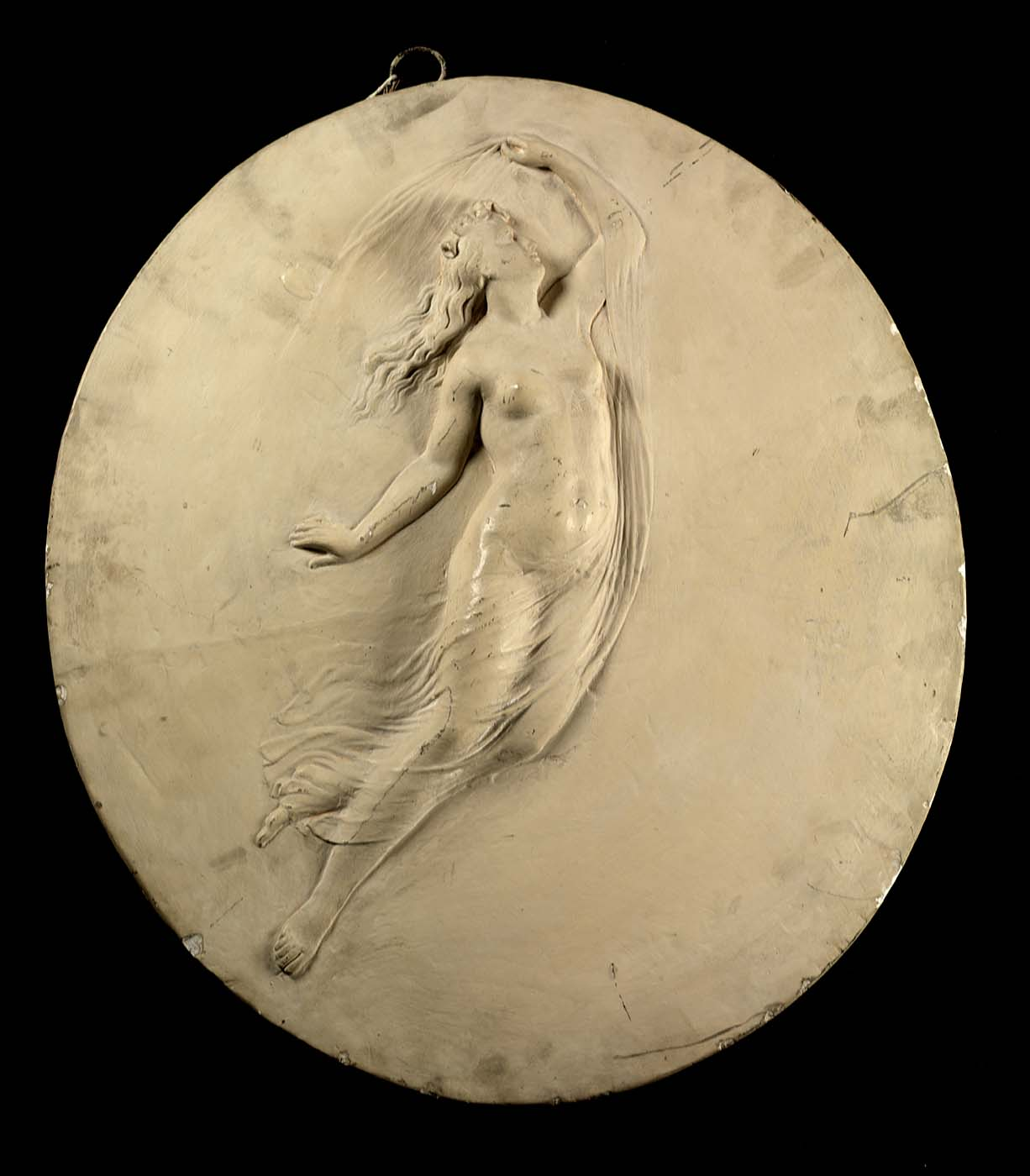
Morning (c. 1856), Smithsonian American Art Museum, Washington, D.C.

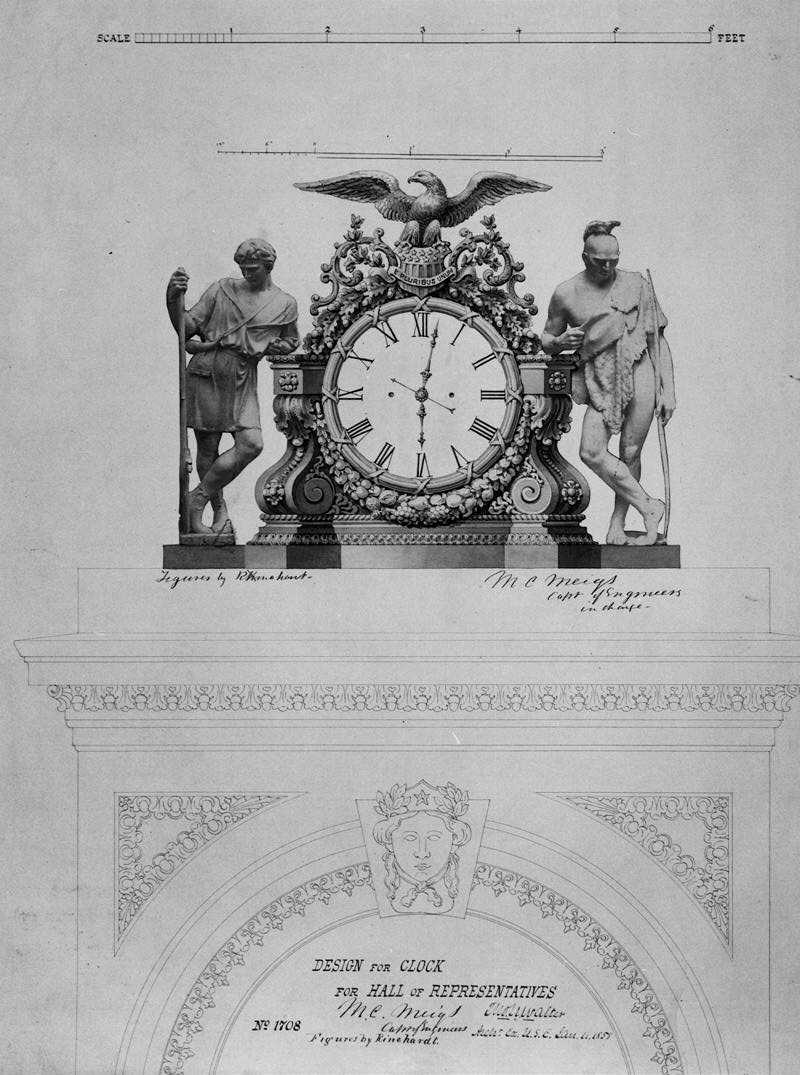
Rinehart's drawing for the Monumental Clock (1858), House of Representatives Chamber, U.S. Capitol.

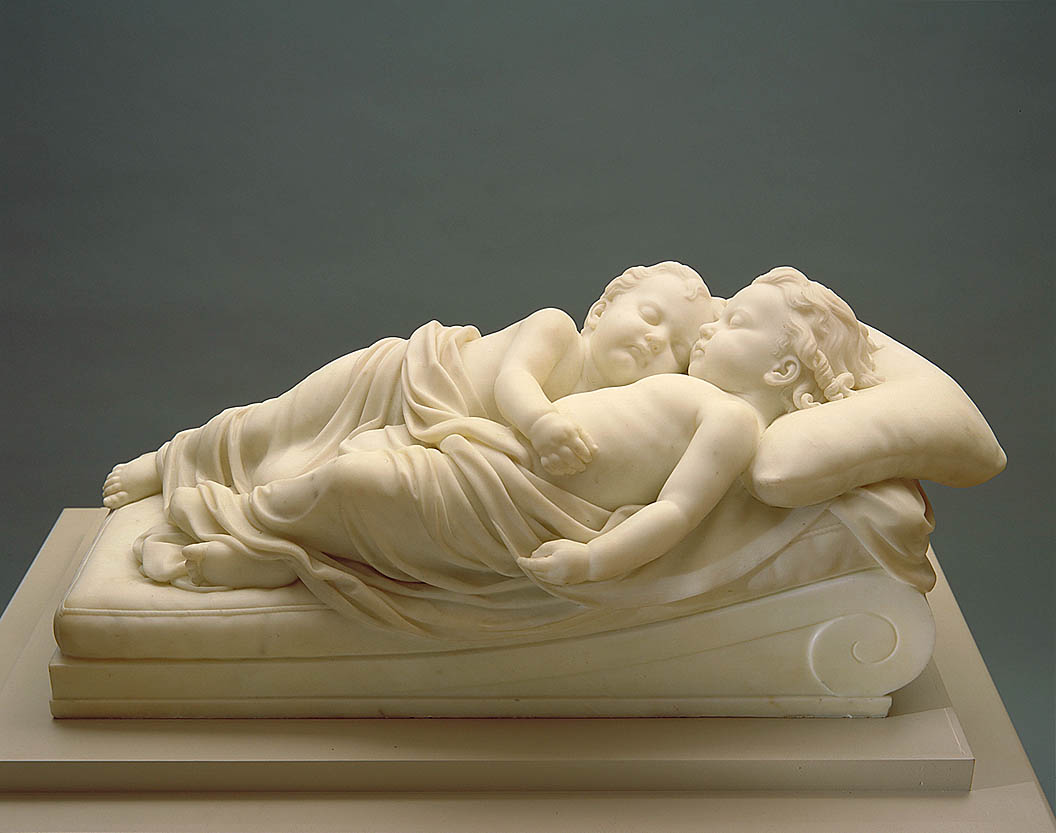
Sleeping Children (1859, this example 1869), Smithsonian American Art Museum, Washington, D.C.

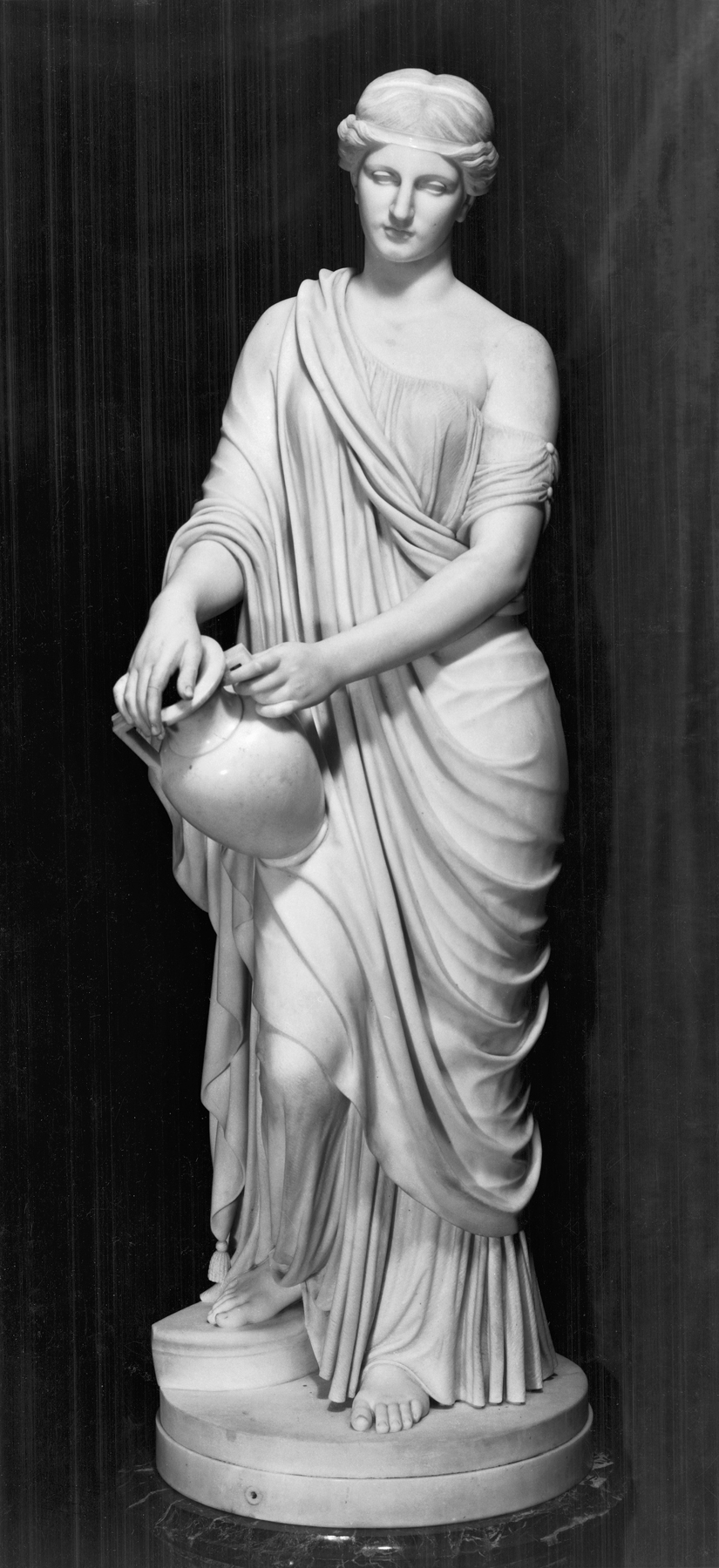
Woman of Samaria (1859–1862), Walters Art Museum, Baltimore, Maryland

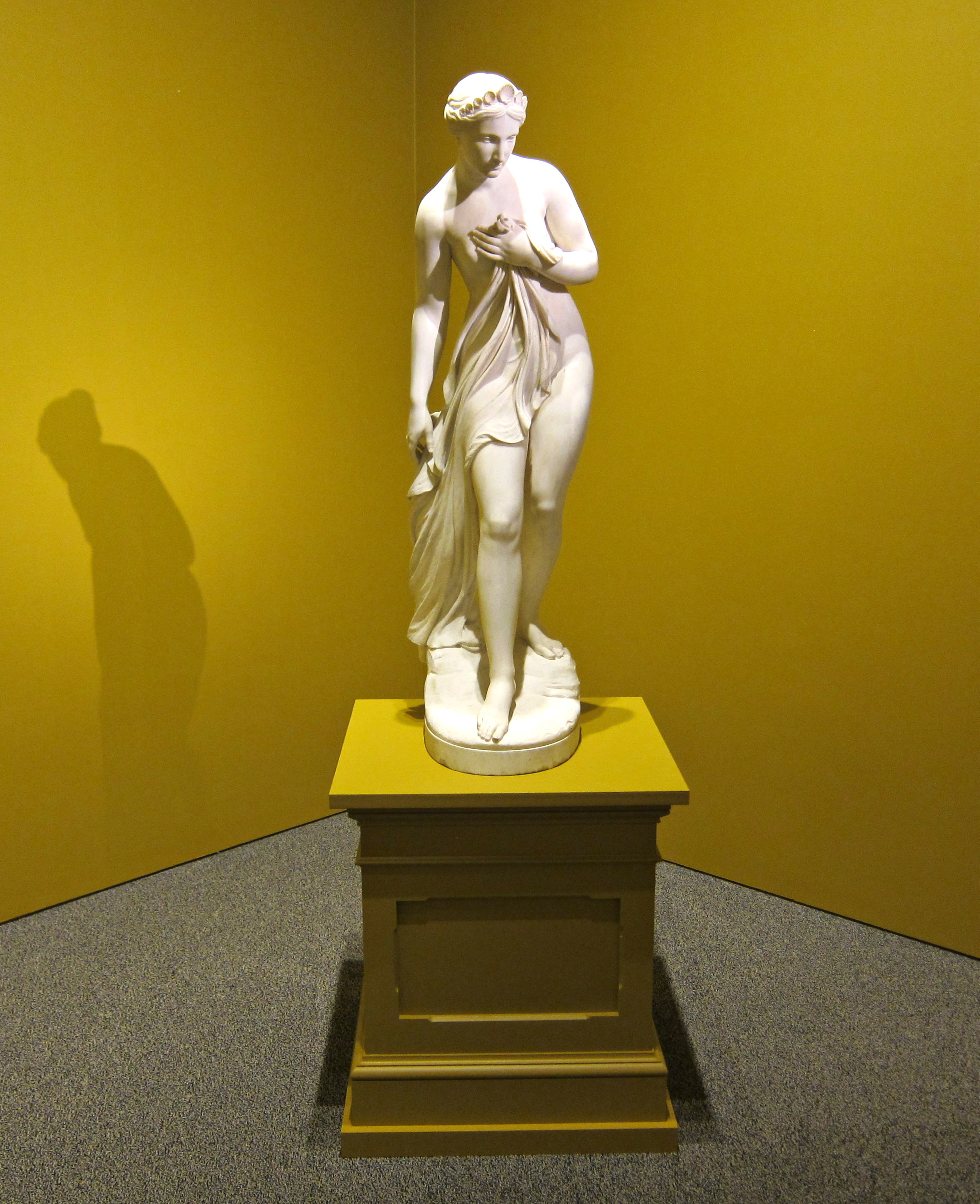
Thetis (1861), Walters Art Museum, Baltimore, Maryland.

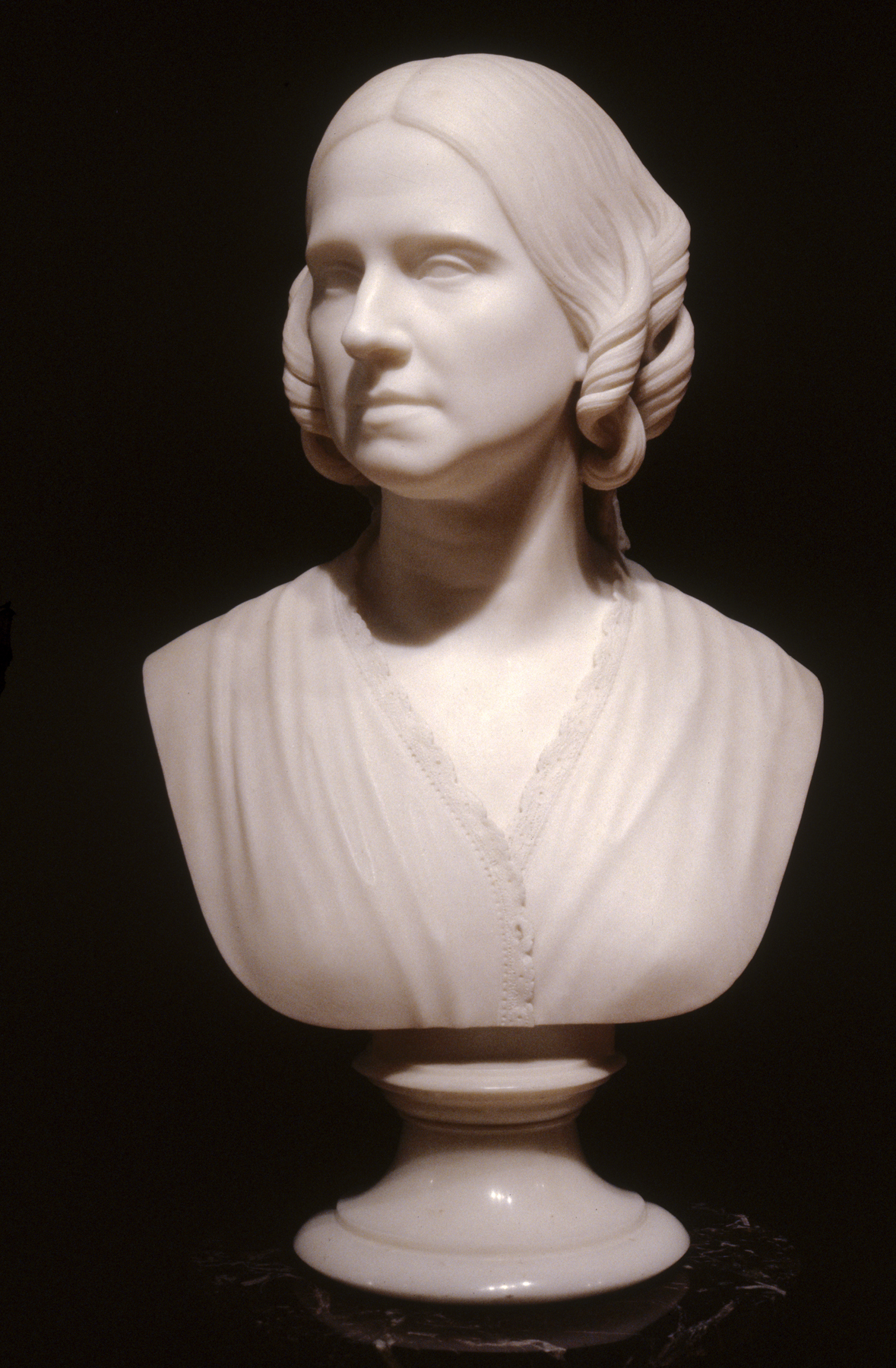
Bust of Mrs. William T. Walters (1862), Walters Art Museum, Baltimore, Maryland.

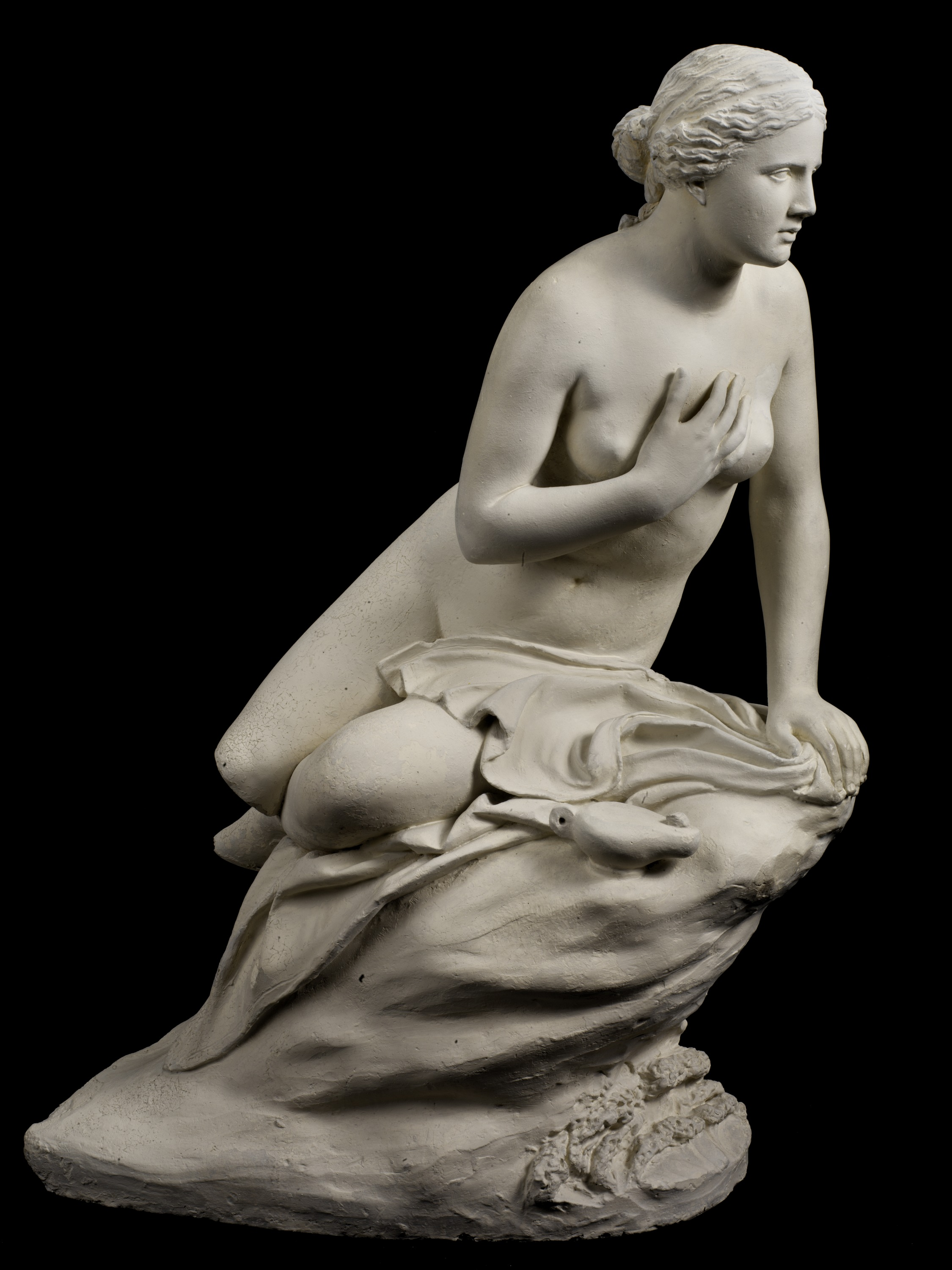
Hero (1866), Smithsonian American Art Museum, Washington, D.C.

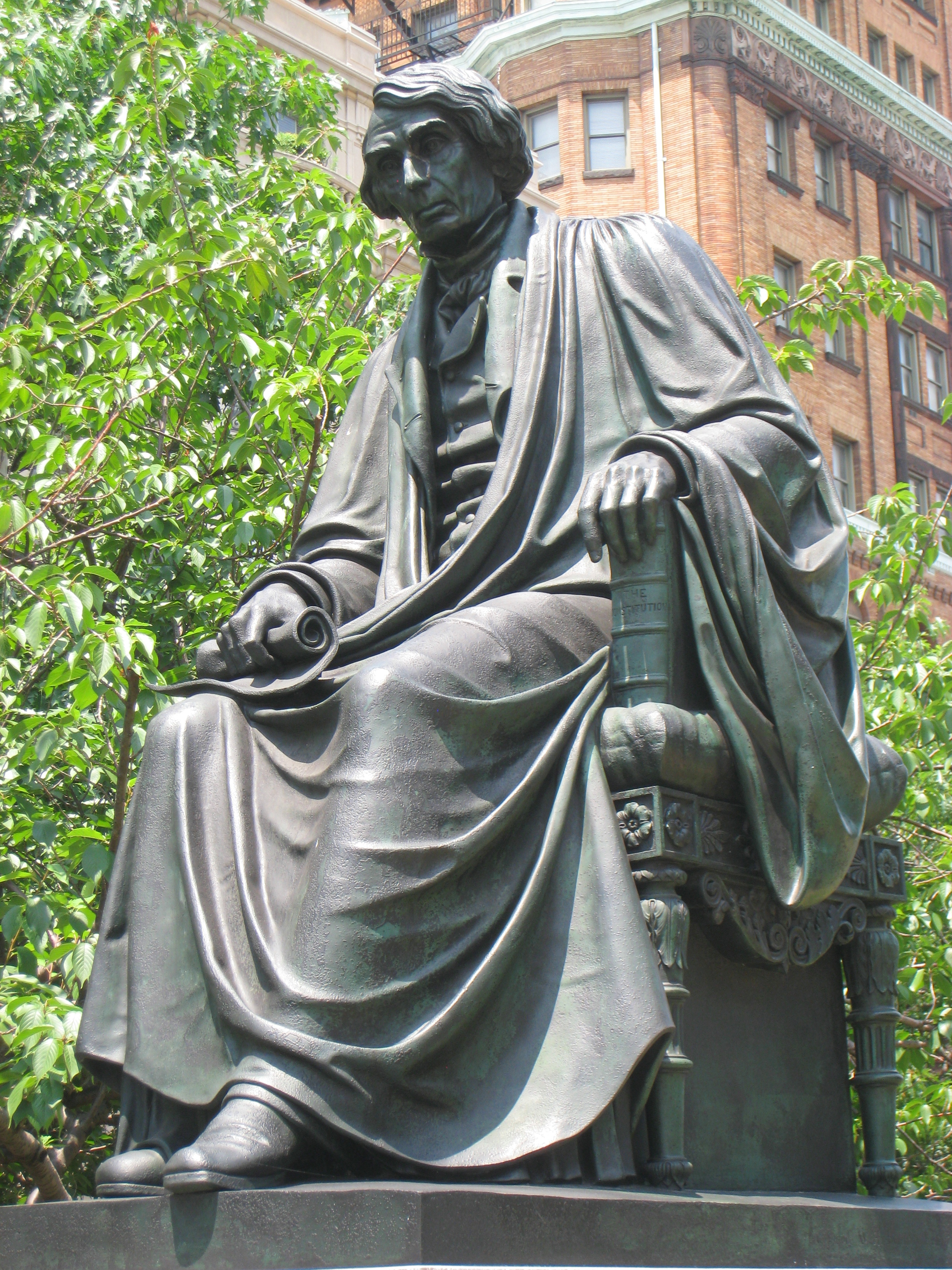
Chief Justice Roger B. Taney (1867–72), Mount Vernon Place, Baltimore, Maryland.

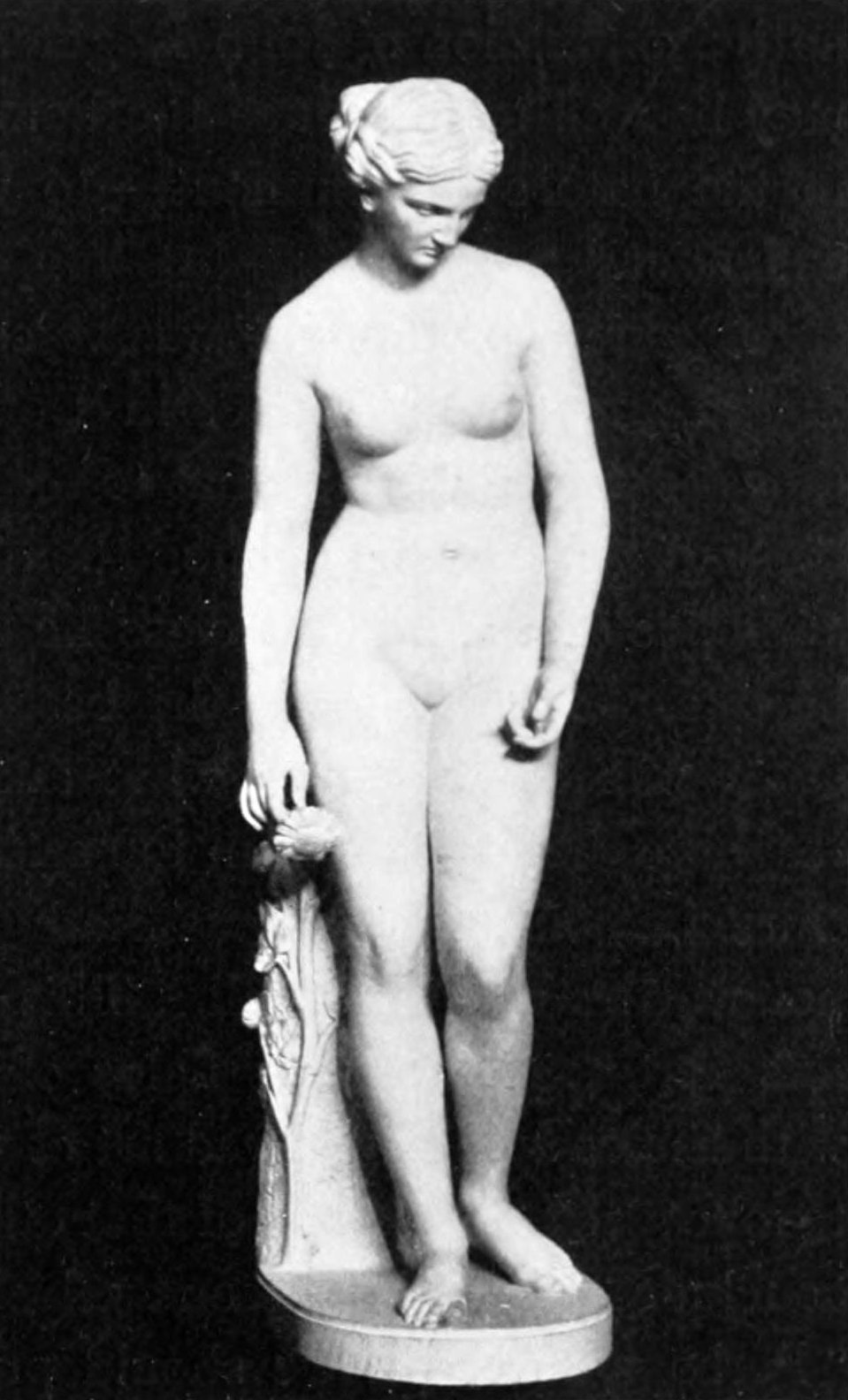
Clytie (1872), Baltimore Museum of Art, Baltimore, Maryland.

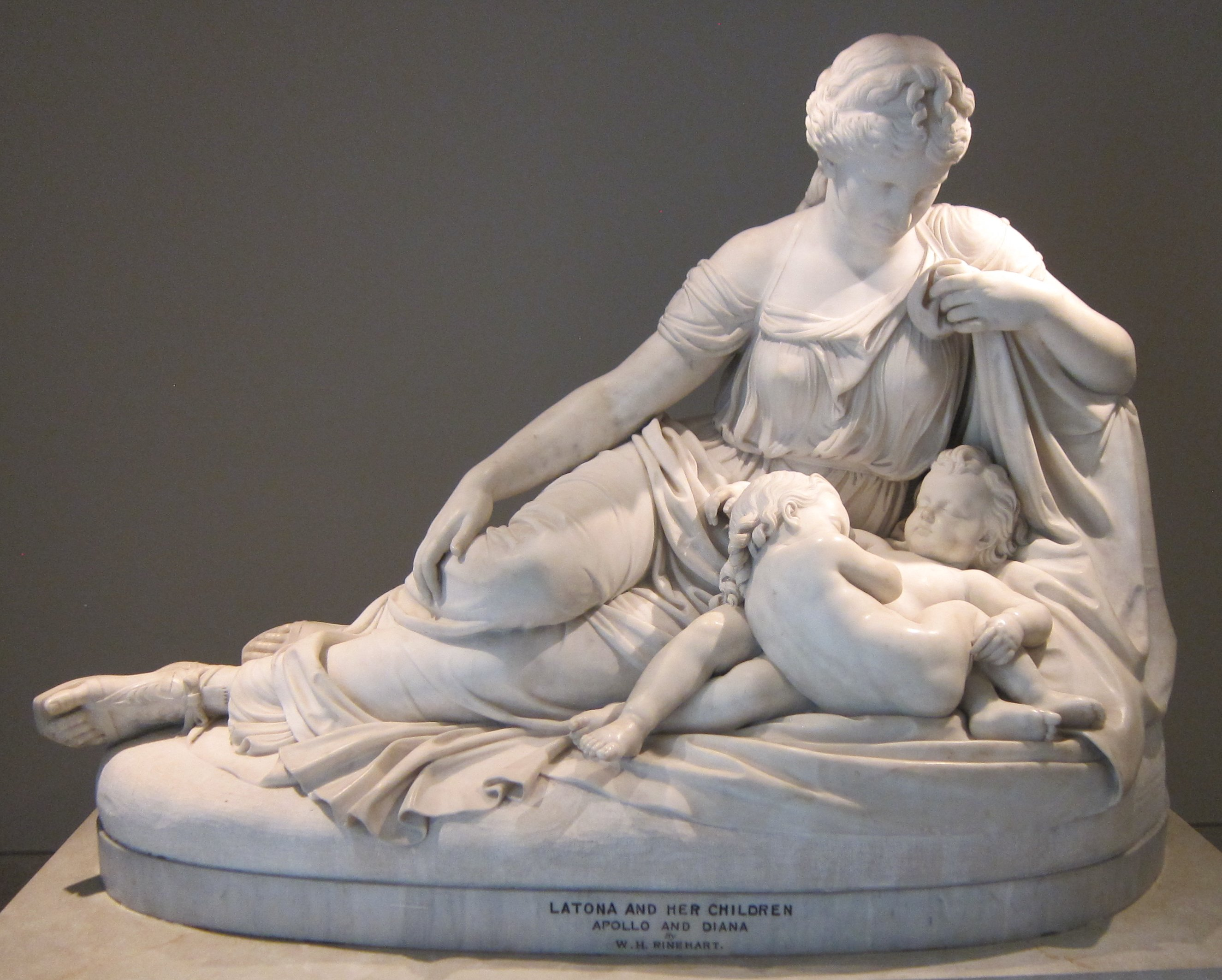
Latona and Her Children - Apollo and Diana (1871–74), Metropolitan Museum of Art, New York City

== See also ==
- Maryland Institute College of Art
- Walters Art Museum
- Neoclassicism
- Arthur Quartley (American painter; friend of William Henry Rinehart)
- Roger B. Taney (sculpture)
- Revolutionary War Door, which was completed by Reinhart and hangs in the U.S. Capitol
