= McKinley, St. Louis County, Minnesota =

City in Minnesota, United States

McKinley, Minnesota
- City
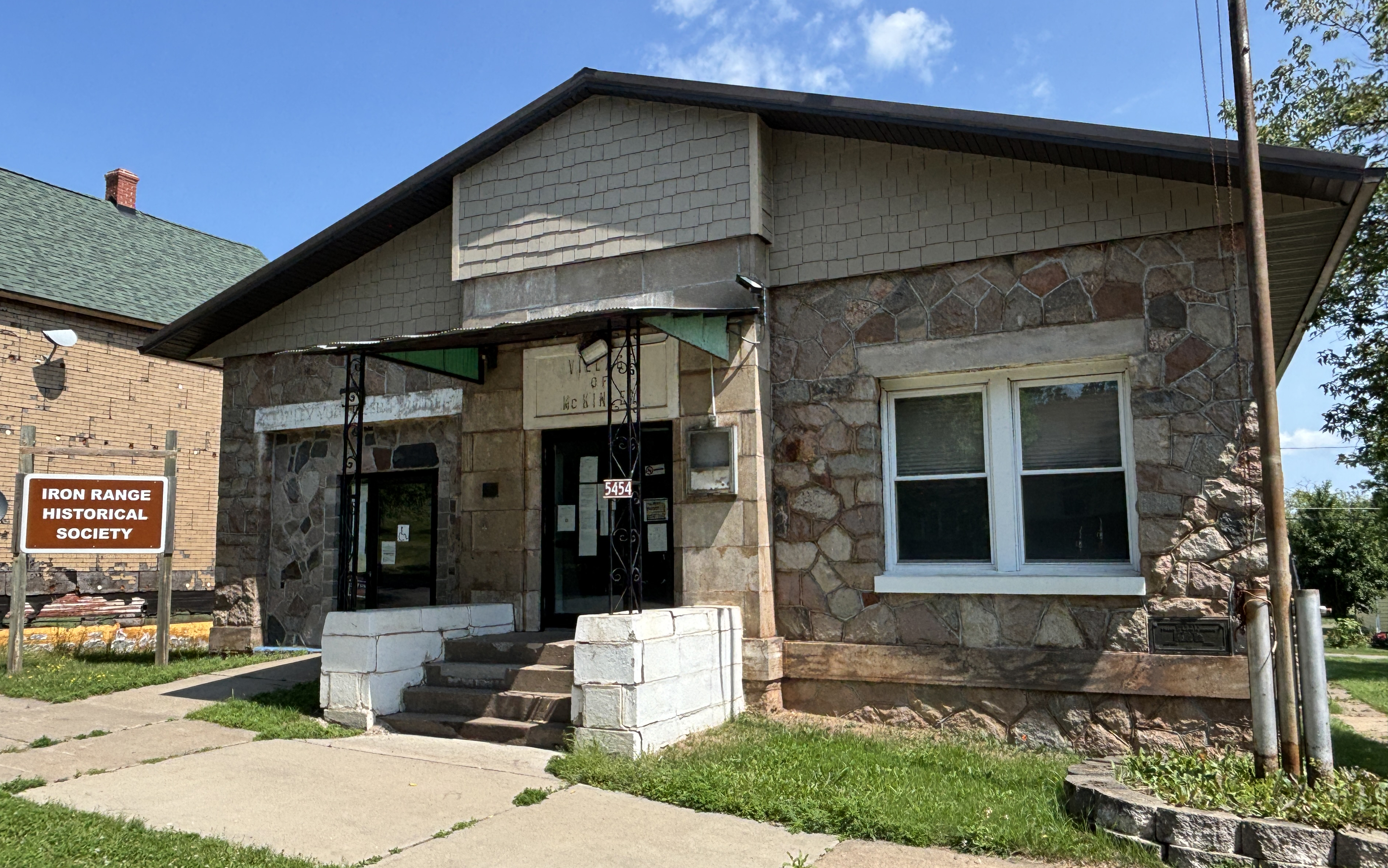
- McKinley Village Hall-Iron Range Historical Society building

- Location of the city of McKinley within Saint Louis County, Minnesota
- Coordinates: 47°30′46″N 92°24′40″W
- Country: United States
- State: Minnesota
- County: St. Louis
- Founded: 1890
- Incorporated: 1892

Government
  - Mayor: Tony Nygaard

Area
  - Total: 1.571 sq mi (4.070 km^{2})
  - Land: 1.425 sq mi (3.692 km^{2})
  - Water: 1.472 sq mi (3.812 km^{2})
- Elevation: 1,480 ft (451 m)

Population (2020)
  - Total: 103
  - Estimate (2022): 104
  - Density: 72/sq mi (27.9/km^{2})
- Time zone: UTC−6 (Central (CST))
  - Summer (DST): UTC−5 (CDT)
- ZIP Code: 55741
- Area code: 218
- FIPS code: 27-39140
- GNIS feature ID: 0661888
- Sales tax: 7.375%

McKinley is a city in Saint Louis County, Minnesota, United States; located within the Iron Range region of Minnesota. The population was 103 at the 2020 census.

State Highway 135 (MN 135), Saint Louis County Road 20 (CR 20), and Main Street are three of the main routes in McKinley.

McKinley is located seven miles east of the city of Virginia. Gilbert and Biwabik are nearby.

== History ==
A post office called McKinley was established in 1892, and remained in operation until 1991. The city was named for three McKinley brothers (Duncan, John, and William) who were businessmen in the mining industry. McKinley was incorporated in 1892.

== Geography ==
According to the United States Census Bureau, the city has a total area of 1.571 square miles (4.07 km^{2}); 1.426 square miles (3.69 km^{2}) is land and 0.147 square miles (0.38 km^{2}) is water.

== Demographics ==
Historical population
| Census | Pop. | Note | %± |
|---|---|---|---|
| 1900 | 262 | | — |
| 1910 | 411 | | 56.9% |
| 1920 | 395 | | −3.9% |
| 1930 | 304 | | −23.0% |
| 1940 | 235 | | −22.7% |
| 1950 | 196 | | −16.6% |
| 1960 | 408 | | 108.2% |
| 1970 | 317 | | −22.3% |
| 1980 | 230 | | −27.4% |
| 1990 | 116 | | −49.6% |
| 2000 | 80 | | −31.0% |
| 2010 | 128 | | 60.0% |
| 2020 | 103 | | −19.5% |
| 2022 (est.) | 104 | | 1.0% |
U.S. Decennial Census; 2020 Census

=== 2010 census ===
As of the 2010 census, there were 128 people, 56 households, and 36 families living in the city. The population density was 87.7 inhabitants per square mile (33.9/km^{2}). There were 67 housing units at an average density of 45.9 per square mile (17.7/km^{2}). The racial makeup of the city was 93.8% White, 4.7% from other races, and 1.6% from two or more races. Hispanic or Latino of any race were 6.3% of the population.

There were 56 households, of which 28.6% had children under the age of 18 living with them, 48.2% were married couples living together, 12.5% had a female householder with no husband present, 3.6% had a male householder with no wife present, and 35.7% were non-families. 32.1% of all households were made up of individuals, and 21.4% had someone living alone who was 65 years of age or older. The average household size was 2.29 and the average family size was 2.92.

The median age in the city was 42.5 years. 25.8% of residents were under the age of 18; 5.5% were between the ages of 18 and 24; 19.5% were from 25 to 44; 29.7% were from 45 to 64; and 19.5% were 65 years of age or older. The gender makeup of the city was 43.8% male and 56.3% female.

=== 2000 census ===
As of the 2000 census, there were 80 people, 37 households, and 25 families living in the city. The population density was 103.3 inhabitants per square mile (39.9/km^{2}). There were 43 housing units at an average density of 55.5 per square mile (21.4/km^{2}). The racial makeup of the city was 97.50% White, and 2.50% from two or more races. 28.6% were of Slovene, 14.3% German, 11.9% English, 9.5% Norwegian and 7.1% Austrian ancestry.

There were 37 households, out of which 24.3% had children under the age of 18 living with them, 62.2% were married couples living together, 2.7% had a female householder with no husband present, and 32.4% were non-families. 32.4% of all households were made up of individuals, and 16.2% had someone living alone who was 65 years of age or older. The average household size was 2.16 and the average family size was 2.68.

In the city, the population was spread out, with 20.0% under the age of 18, 6.3% from 18 to 24, 28.8% from 25 to 44, 16.3% from 45 to 64, and 28.8% who were 65 years of age or older. The median age was 43 years. For every 100 females, there were 110.5 males. For every 100 females age 18 and over, there were 93.9 males.

The median income for a household in the city was $28,750, and the median income for a family was $48,750. Males had a median income of $36,250 versus $20,313 for females. The per capita income for the city was $14,384. There were 16.7% of families and 30.5% of the population living below the poverty line, including 80.0% of under eighteens and none of those over 64.
