= Roger B. Taney Monument (Baltimore) =

Statue by William Henry Rinehart in Baltimore, Maryland, U.S.

Roger B. Taney
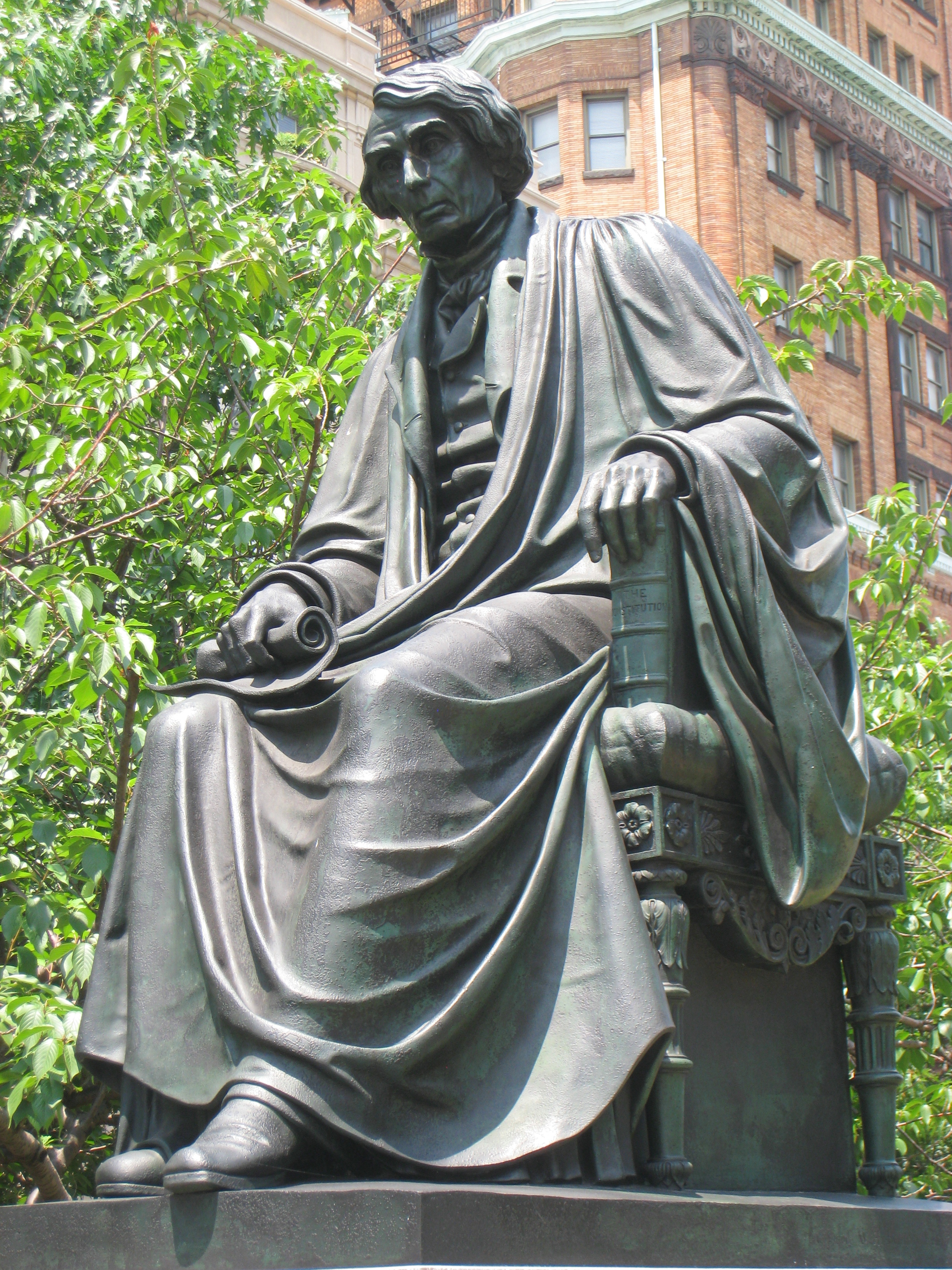
- Statue of Roger B. Taney prior to its removal
- Artist: William Henry Rinehart
- Year: 1871; Recast 1887; removed 2017
- Medium: Bronze
- Dimensions: 220 cm × 120 cm × 160 cm (86 in × 47 in × 62 in)
- Location: Baltimore, Maryland, U.S.; 39°17′52.63″N 76°36′56.47″W
- Owner: City of Baltimore

Roger B. Taney is a 19th-century bronze statue of Chief Justice of the United States Roger B. Taney (1777–1864), by William Henry Rinehart. It was located in Baltimore, Maryland at the North Garden in Mount Vernon Place prior to being removed by the city of Baltimore in 2017.

== History ==
The sculpture was a gift to the City of Baltimore from the businessman and art collector William T. Walters, whose home faced Mount Vernon Place. It is a recast of the Roger B. Taney Monument at Annapolis, Maryland. The sculpture was unveiled to the public in 1887.

Amidst controversy about the presence of a statue honoring the author of the infamous Dred Scott decision, the sculpture was removed by the City of Baltimore in 2017 and put into storage.

In the August 14, 2017, City Council session, they also voted unanimously to remove the Stonewall Jackson and Robert E. Lee Monument, the Confederate Soldiers and Sailors Monument and the Confederate Women's Monument.

== Inscription ==
The inscription read:
(On rear proper left side of sculpture:)
inv et(?) mod. W. H. Rinehart Rom
(On rear proper right side of sculpture:)
FERD. VON MILLER
(...inscription illegible)
MUNCHEN 188(?)
(On scroll in figure's right hand:)
THE CONSTITUTION
(On plaque on front of granite base:)
ROGER B. TANEY OF MARYLAND
CHIEF JUSTICE
signed Founder's mark appears

== See also ==
- List of public art in Baltimore
