= SS Roger B. Taney =

Liberty ship of WWII

History

United States
- Name: Roger B. Taney
- Namesake: Roger B. Taney
- Owner: War Shipping Administration (WSA)
- Operator: Waterman Steamship Corp.
- Ordered: as type (EC2-S-C1) hull, MCE hull 17
- Awarded: 14 March 1941
- Builder: Bethlehem-Fairfield Shipyard, Baltimore, Maryland
- Cost: $1,421,123
- Yard number: 2004
- Way number: 4
- Laid down: 21 June 1941
- Launched: 6 December 1941
- Completed: 9 February 1942
- Identification: Call sign: KTXS
- Fate: Sunk, 8 February 1943

General characteristics
- Class & type: Liberty ship; type EC2-S-C1, standard
- Tonnage: 10,865 LT DWT; 7,176 GRT
- Displacement: 3,380 long tons (3,434 t) (light); 14,245 long tons (14,474 t) (max)
- Length: 441 feet 6 inches (135 m) oa; 416 feet (127 m) pp; 427 feet (130 m) lwl
- Beam: 57 feet (17 m)
- Draft: 27 ft 9.25 in (8.4646 m)
- Installed power: 2 × Oil fired 450 °F (232 °C) boilers, operating at 220 psi (1,500 kPa); 2,500 hp (1,900 kW)
- Propulsion: 1 × triple-expansion steam engine, (manufactured by General Machinery Corp., Hamilton, Ohio); 1 × screw propeller
- Speed: 11.5 knots (21.3 km/h; 13.2 mph)
- Capacity: 562,608 cubic feet (15,931 m^{3}) (grain); 499,573 cubic feet (14,146 m^{3}) (bale)
- Complement: 38–62 USMM; 21–40 USNAG
- Armament: Varied by ship; Bow-mounted 3-inch (76 mm)/50-caliber gun; Stern-mounted 4-inch (102 mm)/50-caliber gun; 2–8 × single 20-millimeter (0.79 in) Oerlikon anti-aircraft (AA) cannons and/or, 2–8 × 37-millimeter (1.46 in) M1 AA guns

SS Roger B. Taney was a Liberty ship built in the United States during World War II. She was named after Roger B. Taney, who was the fifth Chief Justice of the Supreme Court, holding that office from 1836 until his death in 1864. Prior to joining the Supreme Court, Taney served as the United States Attorney General and United States Secretary of the Treasury under President Andrew Jackson.

== Construction ==
Roger B. Taney was laid down on 21 June 1941, under a Maritime Commission (MARCOM) contract, MCE hull 17, by the Bethlehem-Fairfield Shipyard, Baltimore, Maryland; and was launched on 6 December 1941.

== History ==
She was allocated to Waterman Steamship Corp., on 29 January 1942.

On 8 February 1943, she was attacked by German submarine U-160, at 22°0′S 7°45′W. A torpedo wake had been spotted at midnight 20 yd (18 m) ahead of the bow of the unescorted Roger B. Taney. The ship made a 90° turn but U-160 was able to maneuver into position to fire another torpedo that struck Roger B. Taney in the starboard side at the engine room. Her armed guards, while remaining onboard while the crew abandoned ship, fired five rounds in the direction the torpedo had come from. Around 02:30 another torpedo struck the #4 hold causing a tremendous explosion. The armed guard abandoned ship after this last attack.

U-160 then surfaced, and after questioning the survivors, left the area.

In total, eight officers, twenty-nine crewmen, one passenger, and nineteen armed guards had managed to abandon the ship in two lifeboats before it sunk.

One officer and two crewmen had been killed in the initial attack. While the two boats tried to stay together, after 36 hours they became separated. The British MV Penrith Castle was able to rescue one of the boats on 1 March 1943, and dropped the crew off at Bahia, 6 March 1943. On 22 March 1943, the Brazilian merchant ship Bagé was able to rescue the other lifeboat 10 mi (16 km) off the coast of Brazil. The boat had traveled more than 2,000 mi (3,200 km) from the sinking location.

== Bibliography ==
- "Bethlehem-Fairfield, Baltimore MD". www.ShipbuildingHistory.com. 14 August 2008.
- Maritime Administration. "Roger B. Taney". Ship History Database Vessel Status Card. U.S. Department of Transportation, Maritime Administration.
- Davies, James (May 2004). "Specifications (As-Built)" (PDF). p. 23.
- "SS Roger B. Taney".
- "Roger B. Taney".
