= Schüle =

Schüle is a surname (German for school). Notable people with the surname include:

- Emilia Schüle (born 1992), German actress
- Frederick Schule (1879–1962), American athlete
- Manja Schüle (born 1976), German politician
- Tim Schüle (born 1990), German ice hockey player

== See also ==
- Schuler
- Schiller (disambiguation)
- Schuler (disambiguation)
- Schuller
- Schuyler (name)
- Hohe Schule
