= Schuyler =

Schuyler may refer to:

== Places ==
=== United States ===
- Schuyler County, Illinois
- Schuyler County, Missouri
- Schuyler, Nebraska, a city
- Schuyler County, New York
- Schuyler, New York, a town
- Schuyler Island, Lake Champlain, New York
- Schuyler Creek, Seneca County, New York
- Schuyler, Virginia, a census-designated place
- Fort Schuyler, a 19th-century fortification in the Bronx, New York
- Old Fort Schuyler, a Revolutionary War fort that was located in what is now Utica, New York
- Fort Stanwix, at the location of present-day Rome, New York, captured from the British by American forces in 1776 and renamed Fort Schuyler

=== Antarctica ===
- Mount Schuyler, Graham Land

== People ==
- Schuyler (name), a name of Dutch origin, including a list of people with the given name or surname

== Ships ==
- USS Schuyler (AK-209), a cargo ship constructed near the end of World War II

== Songs ==
- The Schuyler Sisters, the fifth song from Act 1 of the musical Hamilton

== See also ==
- Schuler, a surname
- Schuyler Apartments, Spartanburg, South Carolina, United States, on the National Register of Historic Places
- Schuylerville, New York
- Schuyler Falls, New York
- Schuyler Lake, New York
- Skylar (disambiguation)
- Skyler
