= Schiller (surname) =

Schiller is a surname of German origin. Notable people with the surname include:

- Adrian Schiller (born 1964), British actor
- Berle M. Schiller (1944–2025), American judge
- Bob Schiller (1918–2017), American screenwriter
- Bob Schiller (ice hockey) (born 1933), Canadian ice hockey player
- Charlotte von Schiller (1766–1826), wife of Friedrich
- Christian Schiller (1895–1976), British Inspector of Schools and promoter of progressive education
- Dawn Schiller, memoirist
- Eric Schiller (1955–2018), American chess player and linguist
- Erika Schiller (born 1960), Soviet rhythmic gymnast
- Fabian Schiller (born 1997), German racing driver
- Fanny Schiller (1901-1971), Mexican actress
- F. C. S. Schiller (1864–1937), British pragmatist/humanist philosopher
- Frederick Schiller (1901–1994), Austrian-born British film actor
- Friedrich Schiller (1759–1805), German poet and dramatist
- Harvey Schiller (born 1940), American sports executive
- Heinz Schiller (1930–2007), Swiss car driver
- Herbert Schiller (1919–2000), American sociologist
- Julian "Jules" Schiller, Australian TV and radio personality
- Julius Schiller (c. 1580–1627), German astronomer
- Karl Schiller (1911–1994), German economist and politician
- Keith Schiller (born c. 1959), American law enforcement official and security consultant
- Lawrence Schiller (born 1936), American film director and producer
- Leif Schiller (1939–2007), Danish photographer
- Leon Schiller de Schildenfeld (1887–1954), Polish director and critic
- Manfred Schiller (born 1961), German politician
- Margrit Schiller (born 1948), German member of the Red Army Faction
- Martin Schiller (Born 1982), Austrian basketball coach
- Mathieu Schiller (1979–2011), French bodyboarder, shark attack victim
- Mayer Schiller (born 1951), American rabbi
- Nota Schiller (1937–2025), American-born Israeli rabbi
- Patricia Schiller (1913–2018), American lawyer, clinical psychologist and sex educator
- Patrick Schiller (born 1988), American football player
- Paul Schiller (screenwriter) (1903–1977), Czech screenwriter
- Phil Schiller American business executive
- Rob Schiller, American television director and producer.
- Solomon Marcus Schiller-Szinessy (1820–1890), Hungarian rabbi
- Thomas James "TJ" Schiller (born 1986), Canadian skier
- Tom Schiller, American screenwriter, son of Bob
- Vivian Schiller (born 1961), American media executive
- Warwick Schiller (born 1967), Australian horse trainer
- Wilton Schiller (1919–2014), American producer and screenwriter

== Fictional entities ==
- Leland Schiller, fictional character in The Messengers TV series

== See also ==
- Shiller (disambiguation)
- Schilling
