= Eduardo Schilling =

Eduardo Schilling may refer to:

- Eduardo Schilling (businessman) (1852–1925), German businessman
- Eduardo Schilling (footballer) (1883–1971), German footballer
