= Maryland State Archives =

Central depository for government records of permanent value (Maryland)

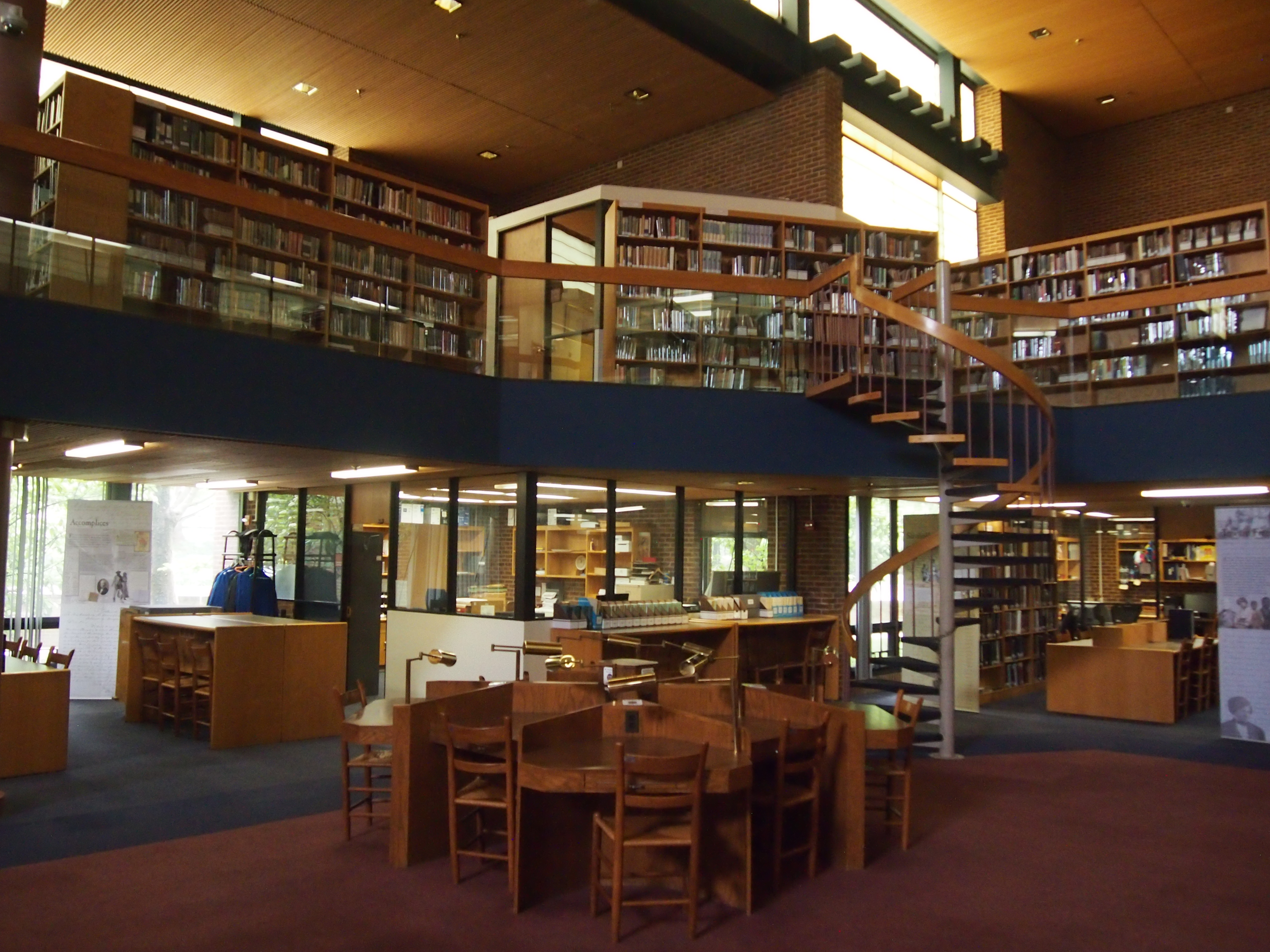
- Interactive map of Maryland State Archives
- 38.98635°N 76.500869°W
- Alternative name: Maryland Hall of Records
- Location: 350 Rowe Boulevard, Annapolis, Maryland, United States
- Type: Government archives
- Established: 1935
- State Archivist: Elaine Rice Bachmann
- Period covered: 1634–present

Building information
- Building: Dr. Edward C. Papenfuse State Archives Building
- Architect: Bruce A. Rich
- Construction date: 1986
- Website: msa.maryland.gov

The Maryland State Archives serves as the central depository for government records of permanent value. Its holdings date from Maryland's founding in 1634, and include colonial and state executive, legislative, and judicial records; county probate, land, and court records; church records; business records; state publications and reports; and special collections of private papers, maps, photographs, and newspapers. These records are kept in a humidity and temperature controlled environment and any necessary preservation measures are conducted in the Archives' conservation laboratory.

The Hall of Records, predecessor of the Maryland State Archives, was created as an independent agency in 1935, charged with the collection, custody, and preservation of the official records, documents, and publications of the state (Chapter 18, Acts of 1935). Impetus for its development can be traced to the state's tercentenary celebrations of 1934. The Maryland Tercentenary Commission made a modern, centralized archives a key feature of the commemoration of the state's 300th anniversary. A "Memorial Hall of Records" was proposed as early as 1928, and in 1931, the Maryland General Assembly appropriated funds to erect an archives building which was opened to the public in 1935. A Hall of Records Commission was also created in 1935 to serve as management for the Archives; it took on an advisory role in 1984. The Hall of Records was incorporated into the Maryland Department of General Services in 1970 (Chapter 97, Acts of 1970). In 1984, it was renamed the State Archives and became an independent agency within the office of the Governor (Chapter 286, Acts of 1984).

From 1935 to 1986 the collection was housed in a building called the Hall of Records on the St. John's College campus in Annapolis with a capacity of 18,000 cubic feet. In 1986, construction was completed and the collections were moved into a new building, now called the Dr. Edward C. Papenfuse State Archives Building, with a capacity of 160,000 cubic feet.
