= Anthony Waichulis =

American painter

- Born: Anthony J. Waichulis; August 10, 1972; Pennsylvania
- Education: Luzerne County Community College
- Spouse: Ava Waichulis (artist)

Anthony Waichulis (born 1972) is a contemporary trompe-l'œil painter from rural Northeastern Pennsylvania. Celebrated by critics and collectors alike, Waichulis' works have been published in many major art publications including The Artist's Magazine, Fine Art Connoisseur, American Artist, American Art Review, American Art Collector, Art News, and Art-Talk. Anthony, represented by Gallery 1261 in Denver, has exhibited in numerous key venues across the country including the Smithsonian Institution, National Arts Club, Butler Institute of American Art, Orlando Museum of Art, Arnot Art Museum, and the Beijing World Art Museum among others. Waichulis has also achieved top honors in prestigious national and international competition held today including The Artist's Magazine's Annual Competition and the Art Renewal Center's International Salon Competition. In January 2006, Anthony became the first trompe-l'œil painter to be granted Living Master status with The Art Renewal Center.

== Early life ==
Waichulis’ love of art started at a young age, when his grandmother would give him and his siblings pencils and paper to keep them occupied in her home. He began drawing for hours on end whenever he visited his grandmother. Waichulis admitted that when he decided to go to college for art, people he had known throughout his life were baffled, “I’m a geeky kid from Northeastern Pennsylvania. When I told people I was going to go to school for art, they looked at me like I was going to build a nuclear missile in my backyard.” Anthony’s parents stood behind him when he decided to attend college to pursue his love for art.

== Education ==
Waichulis’ formal art education began in 1986 at the Art Hatchery in Bear Creek, Pennsylvania. He studied there until he enrolled in Luzerne County Community College, which he attended from 1992 to 1994. Continuing his education, Waichulis began attending the Schuler School of Fine Arts in Baltimore, Maryland in 1995, graduating two years later.

== Career ==
In 1998, Waichulis opened The Waichulis Studio (TWS). His unique system of training would produce several contemporary realist artists, and the TWS atelier would become a respected apprenticeship studio in the United States. In 2010, Anthony’s Waichulis Studio caught the attention of a newly forming entity with aspirations for an educational effort on a global scale.

Waichulis’ current undertaking, the Ani Art Academies, was the brainchild of Tim Reynolds, co-founder of a Wall Street trading firm, artist, patron of the arts, and founder of the Tim Reynolds Foundation. Reynolds’ vision was to create a non-profit effort that would provide an intensive multi-year art skills education to aspiring artists around the world. In 2011, the Waichulis Studio merged with the Ani Art Academies project to form the Ani Art Academy Waichulis. In order to provide individual attention for each pupil, only eleven applicants are accepted each year. Since it began, the Ani Art Academies project has seen the launch of two international Academies: one in Anguilla and one in the Dominican Republic. Additional academies using Waichulis's celebrated curriculum are scheduled to open in Thailand, Indonesia, and Sri Lanka in the near future.

In 2010 Waichulis contributed a piece entitled Young Leia to the book Star Wars Art: Visions. He also worked as an art professor at his alma mater. In 2014, his works were featured in two exhibitions: Still Life, Floral and trompe-l'œil at the John Pence Gallery in San Francisco, CA and Heroes, Villains, Myths and Legends at the Rehs Galleries in New York City. Since his first exhibition there in 1999, Waichulis has presented his works many times at the John Pence Gallery. In addition to his presence in major galleries and publications, Waichulis also appeared on Art Scene with Erika Funke, a local television program, in 2009 and 2011. Waichulis makes very few new pieces available each year for others to purchase, and the prices of these pieces range from $3,500 to $45,000.

== Personal life ==
Anthony lives with his wife and fellow artist, Ava Waichulis, in Bear Creek, Pennsylvania.
