= Schilling (surname) =

Schilling is a German surname. Notable people with the surname include:

- Anne Schilling, American mathematician
- Bobby Schilling (1964–2021), American politician from Illinois
- Christian Schwarz-Schilling (born 1930), German politician
- Claudia Schilling (born 1968), German politician
- Claus Schilling (1871–1946), German experimenter in Nazi concentration camps executed for war crimes
- Curt Schilling (born 1966), American baseball player
- David C. Schilling (1918–1956), American military officer
- Eduardo Schilling (businessman) (1852–1925), German gunsmith and businessman
- Eduardo Schilling (footballer) (1883–1971), German footballer
- Francis X. Schilling (1868–1949), American farmer and politician
- Frank Schilling (born 1969), internet investor
- Friedrich Schilling (1858–1960), German mathematician
- Govert Schilling (born 1956), Dutch popular science writer and amateur astronomer
- Gus Schilling (1908–1957), American film actor
- Hans Schilling (aviator) (1892–1916), German flying ace
- Harry W. Schilling (1887–1958), American farmer and politician
- Heinz Schilling (born 1942), German historian
- Jeffrey Schilling, American hostage captured by Abu Sayyaf
- Jerry Schilling (born 1942), American talent manager, member of Elvis Presley's Memphis Mafia
- Joe Schilling (born 1984), American kickboxer
- Mel Schilling (1972–2026), Australian television presenter
- Minna Schilling (1877–1943), German politician
- Pavel Schilling (1786–1837), Estonian-German Russian diplomat
- Peter Schilling (born 1956), German synthpop musician
- Reinhard Schwarz-Schilling (1904–1985), German composer
- Robert Schilling (historian) (1913–2004), French scholar
- Samuel Peter Schilling (1773–1852) German entomologist
- Taylor Schilling (born 1984), American actress
- Tom Schilling (born 1982), German actor
- Walter Schilling (1895–1943), German general
- Warner R. Schilling (1925–2013), American political scientist and international relations scholar
- William G. Schilling (1939–2019), American actor, Head of the Class
