= Schouler =

Schouler is a surname. Notable people with the surname include:

- James Schouler (1839–1920), American lawyer and historian
- William Schouler (1814–1872), American journalist, politician, and general

== See also ==
- Schuler
