= Schuler =

Schuler, also Schüler, Shuler, and Shuhler, is a surname. The German word Schüler directly translates to the English word scholar and has the meaning "pupil" in German. Notable people with the surname include:

- Adon Shuler (born 2004), American football player
- Anthony Joseph Schuler, American Roman Catholic bishop
- Charles Peter Schuler, American businessman and politician
- Diane Schuler, American motorist responsible for the 2009 Taconic State Parkway crash
- Else Lasker-Schüler, (1869–1945), German poet and playwright
- Franz Schuler (born 1962), Austrian biathlete
- Hans Schuler, American sculptor
- Heath Shuler, American football player and politician
- Jacob Schueler, German-American businessman
- James Shuler, American boxer
- Jim Shuler, American politician from Virginia
- Johannes Schüler (1894–1966), German conductor
- Katharina Schuler (born 1986), German politician
- Luca Schuler (footballer) (born 1999), German footballer
- Luca Schuler (skier) (born 1998), Swiss skier
- Michael Schüler (born 1997), German footballer
- Manfred Schüler (1932–2025), German economist and politician
- Manfred Schüler (speed skater) (1935–2001), German speed skater
- Markus Schuler (born 1977), German footballer
- Max Schuler, German engineer, first described the Schuler tuning
- Mickey Shuler, American football player
- Mickey Shuler, Jr., American football player
- Mike Schuler, American basketball coach
- Phillip Schuler (1893–1917), Australian journalist
- Raymond T. Schuler, American transport commissioner from New York
- Robert P. Shuler, American preacher, politician and advocate of alcohol prohibition
- Ron Schuler, Canadian politician
- Théophile Schuler, French painter
- Werner Schuler (born 1990), Peruvian footballer
- Wolfgang Schüler (1958–2024), German footballer

== See also ==
- Schüle
- George Schueler House, a historic home in Sarasota, Florida
- Schiller (disambiguation)
- Schuler (disambiguation)
- Schuller
- Schuyler (name)
