= Sklar =

Sklar, Skliar, or Sklyar is a Ukrainian and Belarusian surname meaning "glassmaker". Notable people with the surname include:

- Abe Sklar (1925–2020), American mathematician
- Dusty Sklar (born 1928), American author and researcher
- Jessica Sklar (born 1973), American mathematician, daughter of Lawrence
- Jessica Seinfeld (born 1971), formerly Sklar, American author and philanthropist
- Lawrence Sklar (1938–2024), American philosopher, father of Jessica
- Leland Sklar (born 1947), American musician
- Marty Sklar (1934–2017), American business executive
- Matthew Sklar (born 1973), Broadway composer
- Michael Sklar (1944–1984), American actor
- Pamela Sklar (1959–2017), American psychiatrist and neuroscientist
- Rachel Sklar (born 1972), Canadian lawyer and media blogger
- Rick Sklar (1930–1992), American radio program director
- Robert Sklar (1936–2011), American historian
- the Sklar Brothers (Randy and Jason) (born 1972), American identical twin comedians and actors

== Sklyar, Skliar ==
- Alexandr Sklyar (born 1988), Kazakhstani swimmer
- Alexander F. Sklyar (born 1958), Russian musician
- Bill Skliar, designer of Skliar Aqua Glider
- Gennady Sklyar, Russian politician
- Igor Sklyar (born 1957), Russian actor and singer
- Iosif Sklyar (died 1919), Bolshevik revolutionary
- Ivan Skliar (1906–1970), Ukrainian bandurist and musical instrument designer
- Oleksandr Sklyar (born 1991), Ukrainian footballer
- Roman Sklyar (born 1971), Kazakhstani politician

== See also ==
- Shklar
- Moacyr Scliar
- Sklyarov
