= Skylar (disambiguation) =

Skyler or Skylar is a unisex given name. It may also refer to:

== Arts and entertainment ==
- Skylar, ska and reggae band formed by members of the group Howards Alias
  - Skylar (album), the band's 2006 album
- Skylar, a 1995 novel by American writer Gregory Mcdonald
- Sunny Skylar, American composer, singer, lyricist, and music publisher born Selig Sidney Shaftel (1913–2009)

== Surname ==
- Edward Skyler (born 1973), former Deputy Mayor for Operations for New York City
- Tristine Skyler (born 1971), American playwright, screenwriter, and producer

== See also ==
- Schuyler (disambiguation)
- Skyler, a surname and given name
- Kyler, a given name
