= James Buchanan Memorial =

Memorial by Hans Schuler in Washington, D.C., U.S.

- U.S. National Historic Landmark District – Contributing property
- D.C. Inventory of Historic Sites
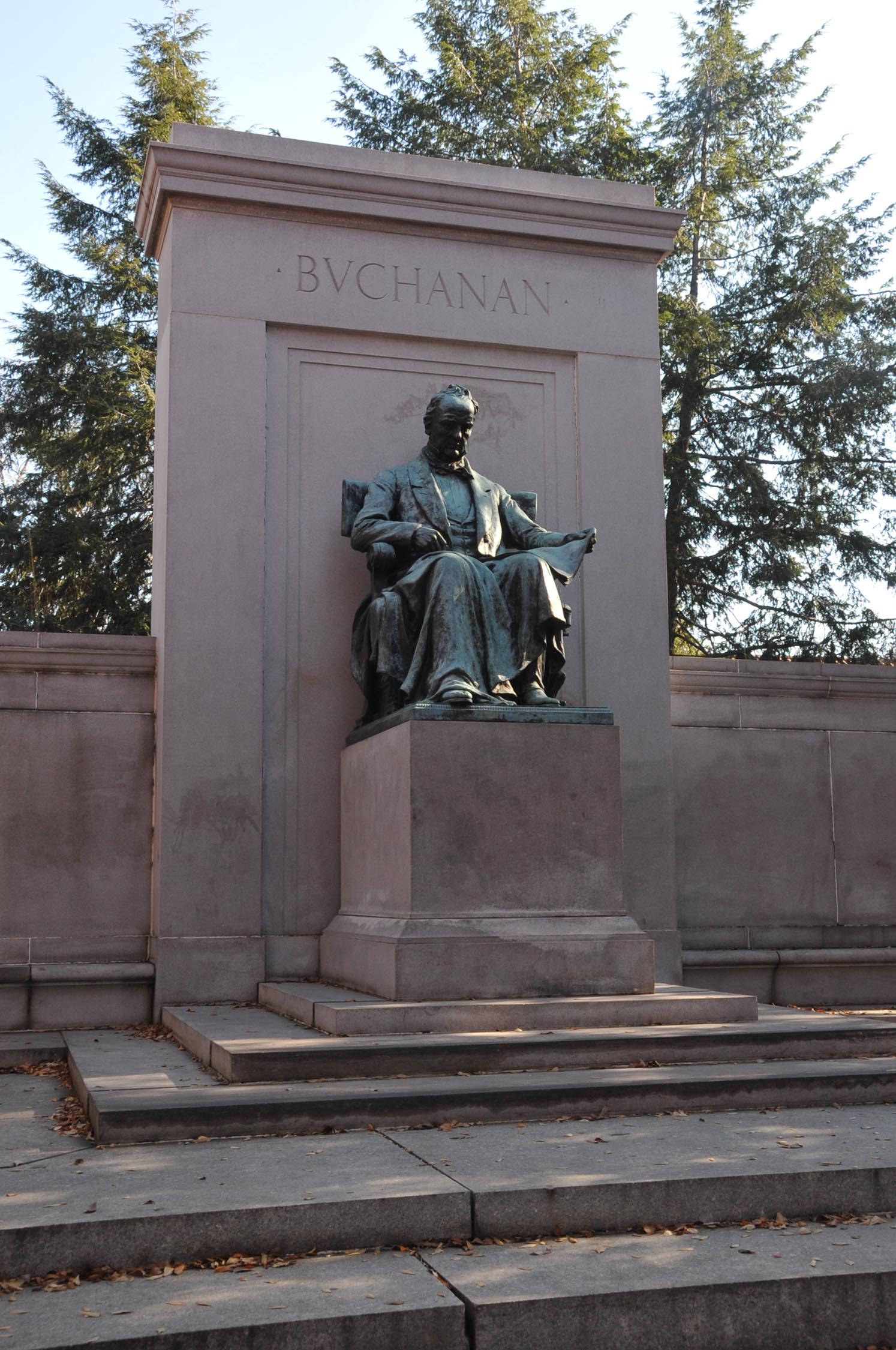
- James Buchanan Memorial in 2012
- Location: Meridian Hill Park, Washington, D.C.
- Coordinates: 38°55′11″N 77°02′06″W
- Built: 1930
- Architect: Hans Schuler (sculptor); William Gordon Beecher (architect); Roman Bronze Works (foundry)
- Part of: Meridian Hill Park National Landmark District (ID74000273)

Significant dates
- Designated NHLDCP: October 25, 1974
- Designated DCIHS: November 8, 1964

The James Buchanan Memorial is a bronze, granite, and concrete memorial in the southeast corner of Meridian Hill Park, Washington, D.C., that honors U.S. President James Buchanan. It was designed by architect William Gorden Beecher, and sculpted by Maryland artist Hans Schuler. The memorial was commissioned in 1916, but not approved by the U.S. Congress until 1918. The memorial features a statue of Buchanan bookended by male and female classical figures representing law and diplomacy, engraved with text from a member of Buchanan's cabinet, Jeremiah S. Black: "The incorruptible statesman whose walk was upon the mountain ranges of the law."

Buchanan had served in various roles for the U.S. government until his election as president in 1856. His term was fraught with several crises, including his inability to stop the Civil War. He is often rated as one of the worst U.S. presidents. His niece, Harriet Lane, served as First Lady during Buchanan's term since he was a bachelor. Later in her life, Lane bequeathed $100,000 for the government to erect a memorial honoring Buchanan in Washington, D.C. After years of debate and delays in constructing Meridian Hill Park, the memorial was finally unveiled and dedicated in June 1930.

The memorial is a contributing property to the Meridian Hill Historic District, a National Historic Landmark. The historic district was added to the District of Columbia Inventory of Historic Sites in 1964 and the National Register of Historic Places in 1974.

== History ==
=== Biography ===
James Buchanan was born on April 23, 1791, in Cove Gap, Pennsylvania. He attended Dickinson College and graduated in 1809. Buchanan showed a keen interest in law and was admitted to the bar in 1812. During the War of 1812, Buchanan was one of the early volunteers to fight the United Kingdom of Great Britain and Ireland. Following the war, Buchanan was elected to the Pennsylvania House of Representatives, where he served for two years. Five year later in 1821, he was elected to the U.S. House of Representatives, where he served for ten years. After his tenure in the House, Buchanan served as U.S. Minister to Russia from 1832 to 1834.

Buchanan was elected to the U.S. Senate in 1834 and served until 1845 when he was chosen to be U.S. Secretary of State. He served in that role until 1849 and was chosen to be Minister to the United Kingdom from 1853 to 1856. Buchanan was elected to be President of the United States in 1857. He only served one term and his presidency is considered one of the worst in U.S. history.

Historian Edward L. Widmer described Buchanan's presidency as the following: "Repeatedly, he made terrible decisions, and when presented with various options, pursued the most extreme pro-slavery position (despite the fact that he came from Pennsylvania). He chose a Cabinet dominated by corrupt slave owners who lined their own pockets and stole government assets. When crises came, he had no answers, because he didn’t think the federal government should intervene. As more people questioned his choices, he angrily dismissed their criticism." The biggest failure of his presidency is often cited to be his inability to avert the Civil War.

=== Memorial ===
==== Planning ====
Harriet Lane was the niece of Buchanan, and as Buchanan was a bachelor, acted as First Lady of the United States during his presidency. She died in 1903 and in her will bequeathed $100,000 for the federal government to erect a memorial of her uncle. There was a stipulation that it had to be accepted by U.S. Congress within 15 years of her death, or the money would return to her estate.

The deadline was drawing near when in January 1916, Senator Blair Lee I introduced a joint resolution to erect a memorial to Buchanan. Later that year, the United States Commission of Fine Arts approved the memorial's design. In December 1916, members of the Pennsylvania Society asked Congress to pass the resolution to erect the memorial, honoring the only president who was from Pennsylvania at that time.

There was a contentious debate amongst members of Congress who supported a memorial or those who strongly opposed. From 1916 to 1918, there was a concerted effort to stop a resolution passing Congress. Amongst the members of Congress who fought against the memorial were Representative Clarence B. Miller and Senators Irvine Lenroot, Reed Smoot, and Henry Cabot Lodge. Miller stated "I would like someone to tell me, if he can, what distinguished services Buchanan rendered anybody that will justify erecting a monument costing the enormous sum of $100,000 to be paid for by anybody, in Meridian Hill Park, one of the showplaces-to-be of the land." Lenroot said "The best thing we can do for Mr. Buchanan is to forget him."

Despite this opposition, on June 27, 1918, Congress passed the legislation to erect the memorial, with the House of Representatives voting 217 to 142 and the Senate voting 51 to 11. President Woodrow Wilson signed the bill into law that same day. The main statue and the two additional statues on the memorial were sculpted by Maryland artist Hans Schuler. William Gordon Beecher, also from Maryland, was the project's architect and Roman Bronze Works acted as the founder.

In July 1929, the main statue was delivered to Washington, D.C., after the two statues on each end of the memorial had arrived. At that time, the memorial dedication was planned to occur in October of that year. Due to bureaucratic debates about the memorial, and delays in construction of Meridian Hill Park, the dedication ceremony did not take place until June 26, 1930.

==== Dedication ====
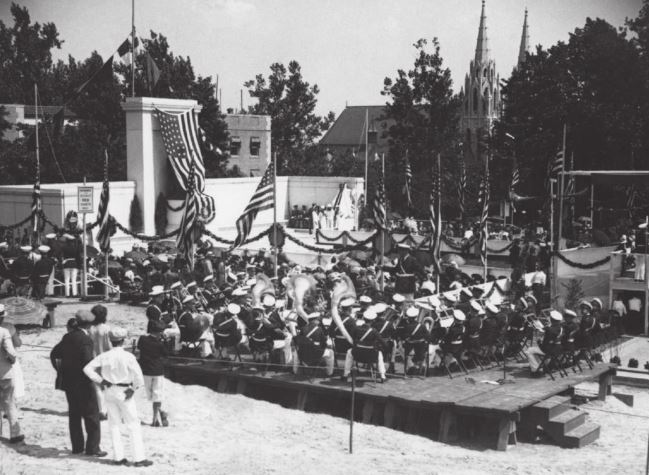
The memorial's dedication ceremony

Amongst those in attendance at the dedication ceremony were government officials, including Secretaries Andrew Mellon and Dwight F. Davis, and many Pennsylvanians. The invocation was given by Godfrey Chabot, pastor of Sixth Presbyterian Church. The opening statement from Lawrason Riggs, who was a trustee of the Buchanan Memorial Fund, was followed by the unveiling of the statue by one of Buchanan's cousins. During the unveiling, the United States Marine Band played and a member of the American Legion sang the national anthem. The sculptor and architect were then acknowledged.

Ambassador Roland S. Morris formally presented the memorial to the U.S. government and gave a biographical speech about Buchanan. This was followed by President Herbert Hoover speaking to the crowd about Buchanan's life and his many years of service to the government. The audience then sang My Country, 'Tis of Thee, homing pigeons were released, and wreaths were laid. The benediction was given by Bishop William Fraser McDowell.

=== Later history ===
The memorial is a contributing property to the Meridian Hill Park Historic District, which was designated a National Historic Landmark on April 19, 1994. The historic district had earlier been listed on the District of Columbia Inventory of Historic Sites on November 8, 1964, and the National Register of Historic Places on October 25, 1974.

== Location and design ==
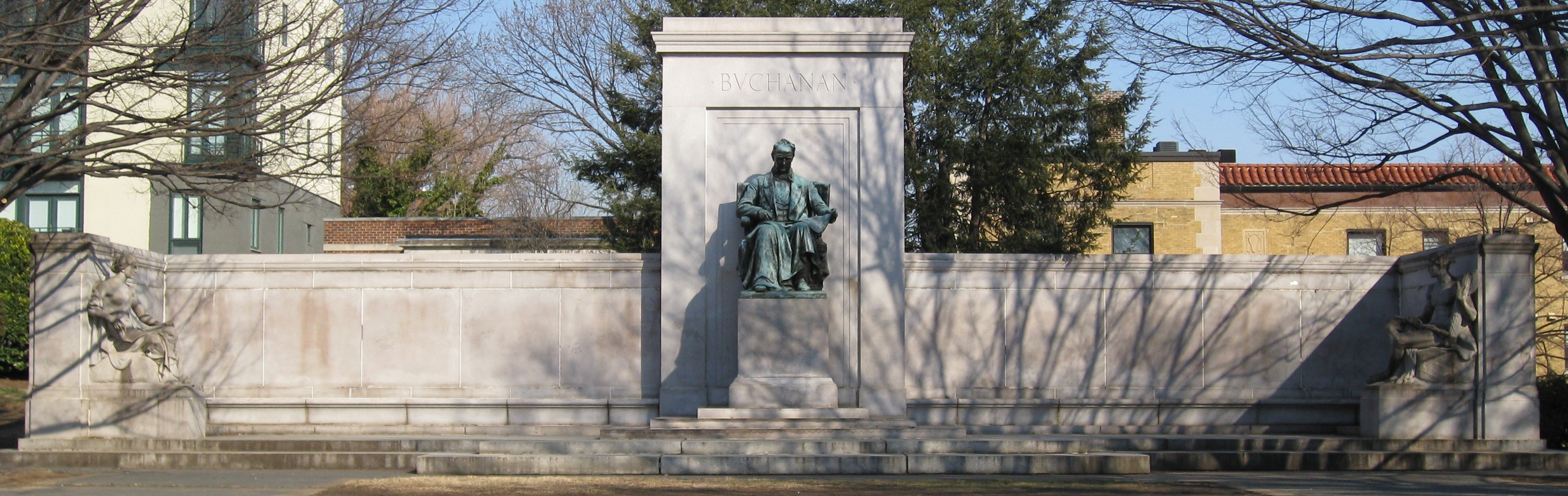
James Buchanan Memorial in 2009

The Buchanan memorial is the largest monument in Meridian Hill Park and the city's only memorial to the former president. The memorial is one of several works in the park. The others are Serenity by Josep Clarà, Dante Alighieri by Ettore Ximenes, the Noyes Armillary Sphere by C. Paul Jennewein, an equestrian statue of Joan of Arc by Paul Dubois, the only equestrian statue of a woman in Washington, D.C.

The memorial is located on the southeast corner of Meridian Hill Park, near the park's reflecting pool, in an area where Columbia Heights, Adams Morgan, and the U Street Corridor intersect. The closest street intersection is 15th and W Streets NW and the memorial is to the right when entering the park from the south. The statue of Buchannan is bronze, but has faded to green due to patina. The statues on each end of the memorial are granite, and the base is Milfor pink marble.

Buchanan's statue is 6-feet 2-inches (1.9 m) tall and the width is 6-feet 7-inches (2 m) wide. He is depicted sitting in a chair and wearing a suit. Draped across his lap is a robe. His left hand is holding papers which Buchanan is reading. The marble base is 5.8-feet (1.8 m) tall and 5.75-feet (1.8 m) wide.

Extending on each side of Buchanan's statue is a stone exedra. At each end of the exedra is a concrete sculpture, one representing Law and the other Diplomacy. The male statue of Law is shirtless and his legs are crossed. A piece of fabric is draped over his lap. He is holding a fasces with his left hand. The female statue of Diplomacy is topless and also has fabric draped over her lower half, part of which hangs from her right arm.

The inscriptions on the memorial, which includes a quote by a member of Buchanan's cabinet Jeremiah S. Black, include the following:

(above the statue)
BVCHANAN

(left wall)
JAMES BUCHANAN OF PENNSYLVANIA
PRESIDENT OF THE UNITED STATES
MDCCCLVII-MDCCClXI

(right wall)
THE INCORRUPTIBLE STATESMAN WHOSE
WALK WAS UPON THE MOUNTAIN RANGES OF
THE LAW

(corner of statue)
Hans Schuler 1929

== See also ==
- List of sculptures of presidents of the United States
- Outdoor sculpture in Washington, D.C.
- Presidential memorials in the United States
