= Skyler =

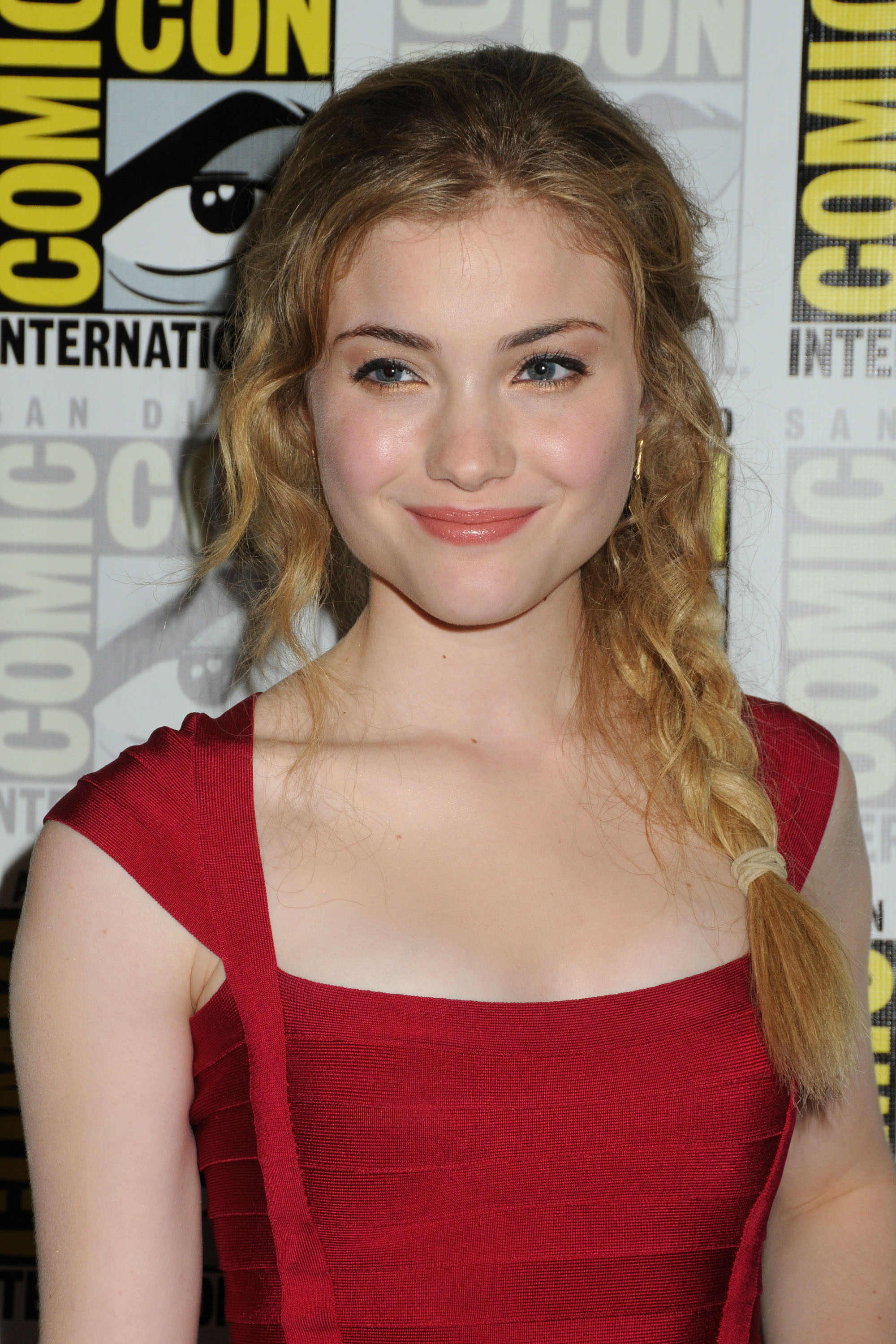
- Skyler Samuels, American actress known for playing Gertrude "Gigi" Hollingsworth in Wizards of Waverly Place on Disney Channel.
- Gender: Unisex
- Language: English

Origin
- Origin: Dutch
- Meaning: student

Other names
- Alternative spelling: Skylar
- Nicknames: Sky, Skye
- Related names: Schuyler

Skyler or Skylar (/ˈskaɪlər/) is a unisex given name, an Anglicized spelling of the surname and given name Schuyler.

Schuyler was introduced into America as a surname by 17th-century Dutch settlers arriving in New York. By the 19th century, in honor of members of New York's Schuyler family such as Philip Schuyler, the surname had entered use as a given name; for example, Schuyler Colfax (1823–1885), the 17th Vice President of the United States.

The spellings Skyler and Skylar first were popularized in the United States during the 1980s. The name is in use for both boys and girls.

== Women ==
- Skylar Ackerman (born 2001), Canadian curler
- Skylar Brandt (born 1993), American ballerina, a principal dancer with the American Ballet Theatre
- Skylar Dahl (born 2003), American Paralympic rower
- Skyler Day (born 1991), American actress and singer
- Skylar Diggins (born 1990), American basketball player
- Skylar Fontaine (born 1998), American ice hockey player
- Skylar Irving (born 2002), American ice hockey player
- Skylar Laine (born 1994), American singer, a competitor on American Idol season 11
- Skylar Little (born 1978) American soccer player
- Skylar Neese (1996–2012), American teen murdered by two of her closest friends
- Skylar Neil (1991–1995), daughter of musician Vince Neil to whom "Skylar's Song" was dedicated
- Skylar Park (born 1999), Canadian taekwondo practitioner
- Skyler Samuels (born 1993 or 1994), American actress
- Skylar Schneider (born 1998), American cyclist
- Skyler Shaye (born 1986), American actress
- Skye Townsend (born 1993), American actress and singer
- Skylar Wallace (born 2000), American softball player
- Skyler White (writer) (born 1967), American writer of fantasy, science fiction, and romance novels

== Men ==
- Skyler Bell (born 2002), American football wide receiver
- Skyler Bowlin (born 1989), American professional basketball player
- Skyler Butts (born 1993), Hong Kong tennis player
- Skyler Gill-Howard (born 2002), American football player
- Skyler Gisondo (born 1996), American actor
- Skyler Green (born 1984), American football player for the Dallas Cowboys
- Skylar Hales (born 2001), American baseball pitcher
- Skyler Howard (born 1994), American football quarterback
- Skylar Astin Lipstein (born 1987), American actor
- Skylar Mays (born 1997), American basketball player
- Skylar Meade (born 1984), American college baseball head coach
- Skyler Page (born 1989), American animator and voice actor
- Skyler Stromsmoe (born 1984), Canadian baseball utility player
- Skyler Stone (born 1979), American actor and comedian
- Skylar Thomas (born 1993), Canadian former soccer player
- Skyler Thomas (born 2003), American football player
- Skylar Thompson (born 1997), American football player
- Skyler Wheeler (born 1993), American politician

== Stage names ==
- Skylar Astin, American actor Skylar Astin Lipstein (born 1987)
- Skylar Grey, Holly Brook Hafermann (born 1986), American multi-instrumentalist, singer, songwriter and record producer
- Skylar Simone, Skylar Star Stecker (born 2002), American singer, songwriter, and actress
- Skylar Spence, Ryan DeRobertis, 21st-century musician and singer

== Fictional characters ==
=== Female ===
- Skylar Adams, in the TV series Alphas
- Skylar Banes, in the computer simulation game Anno 2070
- Skylar Bergman, in the TV series Baywatch
- Skyler Dayton, in the TV series Stacked
- Skylar Deacon, in the 2000 novel Calling the Swan by Jean Thesman
- Skyler "Skye" Miller, a main character of the novel Thirteen Reasons Why, and supporting one in the 2017 Netflix television show's first and second seasons
- Skylar Sinclair, in the video game The Saboteur
- Skylar Stevens, in the television series Jericho
- Skylar Storm, in the TV series Mighty Med
- Skyler White, in the TV series Breaking Bad
- Skylar, in the movie Good Will Hunting, played by Minnie Driver
- Skylar, in the movie Never Rarely Sometimes Always, played by Talia Ryder
- Skyler the Fireworks Fairy, in the book series Rainbow Magic
- Skyler, from the Papa Louie video games

=== Male ===
- Skyler Morse, in the animated TV series South Park

=== Genderless ===
- Skylar, an artificial intelligence in the 3D shooter game Cybermorph

== See also ==
- Skylor Chen, a character in Ninjago
- Sklyarov, a surname
- Sklar and Sklyar, surnames
