= Schiller (disambiguation) =

Friedrich Schiller (1759–1805) was a German poet.

Schiller may also refer to:

== People ==
- Schiller (surname), including a list of people with that name

== Businesses and organizations ==
- Schiller Institute, a LaRouchian think tank
- Schiller Piano Company, a former piano maker whose factory is an NRHP-listed property in Illinois
- Friedrich Schiller University of Jena, Germany
- Schiller International University, Florida, U.S.

== Other uses ==
- Schiller (crater), a lunar impact crater
- Schiller (band), a German electronic musician
- Schiller, the metallic iridescent lustre originating from below the surface of a stone
- SS Schiller, a German ocean liner, wrecked in 1875
- Schiller oder Die Erfindung des Deutschen Idealismus, a 2004 book by Rüdiger Safranski

== See also ==
- Schiller Park (disambiguation)
- Shiller (disambiguation)
