= Shklar =

Shklar (Shkliar, Shklyar, Ukrainian: Шкляр, Russian: Шкляр, Belarusian: Шкляр) is a Ukrainian and Belarusian surname meaning glassmaker. Notable people with the surname include:

- Judith N. Shklar (1928–1992), American political scientist
- Leon Shklar, software developer and author
- Nikolai Shklyar, Russian and Soviet children's writer and playwright
- Vasyl Shkliar, Ukrainian writer and political activist

== See also ==
- Sklar
- Shklyarov
