= Schuler (disambiguation) =

Schuler is a surname.

Schuler may also refer to:

- Schuler, Alberta, Canada
- Schuler Books & Music, a bookstore chain in Michigan, US
- Schuler Group, a German industrial machine manufacturer
- Hans Schuler Studio and Residence, a historic site in Baltimore, Maryland, US
- Schuler Homes, an American homebuilding company acquired by D. R. Horton
