= Schuyler (name) =

- Pronunciation: English: /ˈskaɪlər, ˈskɔɪlər/ SK(O)Y-lər; Dutch: [ˈsxœylər]
- Gender: Unisex

Origin
- Origin: Dutch
- Meaning: student

Other names
- Related names: Schuylar, Skylar/Skyler

Schuyler is a Dutch surname which, along with many variants, including Schuller, is an adaptation of the German name Schüler.

The name was introduced to North America by 17th-century settlers arriving in New York City. It later became a given name in honor of prominent members of New York's Schuyler family such as Philip Schuyler, and so became the given name of Schuyler Colfax, the 17th vice president of the United States.

As a given name, it is used in the United States for both boys and girls, typically with the alternative phonetic spellings Skylar and Skyler. Skylar was the 479th most common name for boys born in the United States in 2007, and the 171st most common name for girls born there in that year. The spelling Skyler was the 271st most common name for boys born in the United States in 2007, and the 374th most popular name for girls. The spelling Schuyler last ranked among the top 1,000 names for boys in the United States in 1994, when it was at 974th place on the charts.

In the Netherlands, Schuyler is not used as a given name.

== People with the surname ==
- Arent Schuyler (1662–1730), American surveyor
- Angelica Schuyler Church (1756–1814), socialite, daughter of Philip, sister of Elizabeth
- Cortlandt V. R. Schuyler (1900–1993), U.S. army general
- David Pieterse Schuyler (1636–1690), Dutch colonist in New Netherland
- Ed Schuyler Jr. (born 1935), American sports writer
- Elizabeth Schuyler Hamilton (1757–1854), wife of American founding father Alexander Hamilton and founder of the New York Orphan Asylum Society
- Eugene Schuyler (1840–1890), American writer, explorer and diplomat
- George Schuyler (1895–1977), African-American author and journalist
- George W. Schuyler (1810–1885), NYS Treasurer 1864–1865
- James Schuyler (1923–1991), American poet
- Leonora St. George Rogers Schuyler (1868–1952), American socialite and clubwoman
- Linda Schuyler (born 1948), Canadian television producer
- Livingston Rowe Schuyler (1868–1931), American historian and Episcopal priest
- Molly Schuyler (born 1967), American competitive eater
- Montgomery Schuyler (1843–1914), American critic, journalist and editorial writer in New York City
- Pieter Schuyler (1657–1724), first mayor of Albany, New York
- Peter Schuyler (New Jersey soldier) (1710–1762), Dutch farmer
- Philip Schuyler (1733–1804), American Revolution general and US senator
- Philip Jeremiah Schuyler (1768–1835), U.S. congressman, son of Philip
- Philip Pieterse Schuyler (1628–1683), Dutch colonist in New Netherland
- Philippa Schuyler (1931–1967), pianist and daughter of George Schuyler
- Robert Livingston Schuyler (1883–1966), American historian
- Vivian Schuyler Key (1905–1990), American artist and designer
- Walter S. Schuyler (1850–1932), first commander of the US Army Pacific Command

== People with the given name ==
=== Schuylar ===
- Schuylar Oordt (born 1987), American football tight end
- Schuylar Croom, band member of He Is Legend

=== Schuyler ===
- Schuyler Bailar (born 1996), American swimmer
- S. Otis Bland (Schuyler Otis Bland, 1872–1950), U.S. Congressman from Virginia
- Schuyler Colfax (1823–1885), U.S. vice president from 1869 to 1873
- Schuyler Erle (born 1977), American software developer
- Schuyler Merritt (1853–1953), U.S. Congressman from Connecticut
- Schuyler M. Meyer (1885–1970), New York politician
- Schuyler Wheeler (1860–1923), American engineer, inventor of the electric fan
- Schuyler Grant (born 1970), American actress
- Schuyler Fisk (born 1982), American actress
- Schuyler Whitney, fictional character from the American soap opera The Edge of Night

== People with the middle name ==
J. Schuyler Long (1869–1933), American educator

== See also ==
- Skylar (disambiguation), includes list of people with given name Skylar
