= Geneva Community High School =

Coordinates: 41°53′37″N 88°19′03″W

Location
- 416 McKinley Ave; Geneva, Illinois; United States

Information
- Type: Public secondary
- Motto: Home of the Vikings
- Established: 1876
- School district: 304
- Principal: Thomas Rogers (Assumed Office 1 June 2007)
- Teaching staff: 123.58 (FTE)
- Grades: 9–12
- Gender: Coed
- Enrollment: 1,635 (2024–2025)
- Student to teacher ratio: 13.25
- Campus: Suburban
- Colors: Royal Blue and white
- Athletics: Yes
- Athletics conference: DuKane Conference
- Mascot: Viking
- Rival: Batavia High School
- Website: Geneva Community High School

Geneva Community High School, or GHS, is a public high school located in Geneva, Illinois, a western suburb of Chicago, Illinois, in the United States. It is part of Geneva Community Unit School District 304.

== History ==
The history of academics dates back to 1876 when the first Geneva High School graduating class consisted of two students. The first building in which classes were held was located at 22 South Third Street in Geneva's downtown district at the site of the current post office. The school was moved to a newly constructed, then state-of-the-art building on Peyton Street in 1923, where it remained until the late 1950s. The Peyton Street facility was converted into a middle school named after Harry Coultrap, the first superintendent of the Geneva School District. After housing the middle school until 1994 and an elementary school until 2009, it was demolished in 2013. The current GHS building was opened in 1958 and was expanded in the 1970s and early 2000s.

== Academics ==
In 2010, Geneva had an average composite ACT score of 24.2, and graduated over 99% of its senior class. Geneva has made Adequate Yearly Progress on the Prairie State Achievement Examination, a state test part of the No Child Left Behind Act.

In addition, in 2010, Geneva had 106 Illinois State Scholars, which constituted 23% of the senior class.

Of the 206 students taking 302 AP tests in 2010, 85% received scores of 3, 4, or 5.

== Athletics ==
Geneva currently competes in the DuKane Conference and Illinois High School Association. School colors are blue and white, and teams are stylized as the Vikings, a nickname that appeared in newspapers as early as 1942, and was first used in the Gecohi, Geneva's yearbook, in 1944 (for the 1943–1944 school year). The title, Gecohi (derived from GEneva COmmunity HIgh School), was renamed the Viking in 1948. Students referred to the school as "Gecohi" as late as 1980.

Geneva's traditional rival is Batavia High School. Batavia High School is located in Batavia, the neighboring town to the south. From 1913 through 2024, the Vikings and the Bulldogs of Batavia High School have faced off on the football field 106 times. The current record is 52–49–5, favoring Geneva. The Batavia-Geneva game is among the top twenty oldest football rivalries in the state of Illinois.

The Geneva girls cross country team won the IHSA Class 3A state championship in 2008.

The girls basketball team won the IHSA Class 4A state title in 2017.

== Notable alumni ==
- Talyn Taylor, (Born 2006), college football wide receiver for the Georgia Bulldogs
- Patrick Schiller, (Born 1988), former NFL Linebacker for the Atlanta Falcons, and St. Louis Rams
- Niykee Heaton, (Born 1994), American singer-songwriter
