= Hohe Schule =

Hohe Schule may refer to:

- Hohe Schule (film), a 1934 Austrian film also called The Secret of Cavelli
- Hohe Schule (university), an alternative name for the University of Ingolstadt
- Hohe Schule, Herborn, a former higher education institute in Germany
- Hohe Schule, Loosdorf, a former Lutheran German grammar school (gymnasium) in Loosdorf, Austria
- Hohe Schule (hill), a hill in Bavaria, Germany
- Hohe Schule (equestrianism), a form of dressage in haute ecole riding
- Advanced School of the NSDAP, the ideological university of the Nazi Party
