= Hohe Schule (hill) =

- Location within Bavaria

Highest point
- Elevation: 538 m above sea level (NHN) (1,765 ft)
- Prominence: 145 m (476 ft)
- Coordinates: 50°29′08″N 10°18′09″E

Geography
- Location: between Völkershausen, Eußenhausen and Hermannsfeld; Rhön-Grabfeld, Bavaria (Germany)
- Parent range: Rhön (Eastern Rhön Foreland)

Climbing
- Access: Forest path from Eußenhausen

The Hohe Schule, formerly also the Aalhauck, near Völkershausen in the Bavarian county of Rhön-Grabfeld is, at about 538 m above sea level (NHN), the second highest hill in the Eastern Rhön Foreland after the Wurmberg (547.7 m). The area includes ramparts and finds from the Hallstatt culture and the Latene Culture, a section of the Landwehr, and the Rhine-Weser Watershed.

== Geography ==
The summit of Hohe Schule rises 1.8 kilometres east-southeast of the village church of Völkershausen (in the municipality of Willmars), 2.6 kilometres north-northwest of the church in Eußenhausen (part of Mellrichstadt) and 2.5 km (as the crow flies) south-southwest of the church of Hermannsfeld (part of Rhönblick). The boundary between the territories of Willmars in the west and Mellrichstadt in the east runs over the summit region from north to south. The western flank of the hill lies within the Rhön Biosphere Reserve. In addition the Rhine-Weser Watershed passes over the summit too. East of the hill rises the Ellenbach and, to the northwest is the source of the River Linz.
