= Patrick Schiller =

American football player (born 1988)

Pat Schiller
No. 56
- Position: Linebacker

Personal information
- Born: November 12, 1988 (age 37); Chicago, Illinois
- Listed height: 6 ft 2 in (1.88 m)
- Listed weight: 234 lb (106 kg)

Career information
- College: Northern Illinois
- NFL draft: 2012: undrafted

Career history
- Atlanta Falcons (2012–2013)*; St. Louis Rams (2014)*
- * Offseason or practice squad member only

Patrick Charles Schiller (born November 12, 1988) is an American football linebacker who is currently a free agent. Schiller was signed as an undrafted free agent following the 2012 NFL Draft by the Atlanta Falcons. He played college football for Northern Illinois University (NIU), where he helped lead the Huskies to MAC Championship. Schiller was signed by the St. Louis Rams of National Football League (NFL) on July 22, 2014, where he was later placed on season-ending Injured/Reserve status.

== Early life ==
A native of Geneva, Illinois, Schiller attended Geneva High School and lettered in football as a linebacker and running back. Schiller earned all-conference as a junior and as a senior earned all-conference all-area and all-state honors.

== College career ==
Schiller recorded 239 tackles in his four-year career with the Huskies. He also tallied 19 tackles for loss, three sacks, eight pass breakups, three forced fumbles, and an interception. He played in 48 games with 27 starts. He tied for seventh in NIU history with 148 assisted tackles in his career despite missing the majority of his junior year due to a knee injury. He was a Mid-American Conference selection in 2011 by Phil Steele Schiller was Named NIU Linebacker of the Year by the coaching staff.

== Professional career ==
=== 2012 NFL draft ===
Pre-draft measurables

Ht	Wt	40-yd dash	10-yd split	20-yd split	20-ss	3-cone	Vert	Broad	BP
6 ft 2 in	234 lb	4.72 s	1.66 s	2.77 s	4.15 s	6.98 s	35.5 in	9 ft 4 in	24

=== Atlanta Falcons ===
Schiller was signed by the Falcons on April 29, 2012. Schiller had a career-high eleven tackles versus the Jacksonville Jaguars on August 30, in their last preseason game of the Falcons. Schiller was signed to the team's practice squad on September 2, 2012. The Falcons went on to have a 13-3 record. The Falcons released Schiller on August 30, 2013.

On November 21, 2012, while on the Falcon's practice squad, Schiller was featured on the cover story of The New York Times Magazine of November 21, 2012, as a "long-shot" for signing a longer-term NFL contract.

After being cut by the Falcons, Schiller helped mentor the linebackers of the Geneva High School Vikings team, in the fall of 2013, both at practices and during games

=== St Louis Rams ===
The St. Louis Rams signed Schiller on July 22, 2014. He was placed on Reserve/Injured status after clearing waivers on August 26, 2014. His playing career ended with an injury settlement after doctors found three herniated discs in his neck.

== Post-NFL career ==
After his NFL career ended, Schiller returned to Geneva, Illinois, working at S&K Landscape Co., a property management and maintenance company that he co-owned. In 2015 he became the varsity linebackers coach at St. Charles East High School in St. Charles, Illinois.
