= Shiller =

Shiller may refer to:

== People ==
- Helen Shiller (born 1947), Chicago politician
- Robert J. Shiller (born 1946), American economist
  - Case–Shiller index
  - Shiller P/E, or Cyclically adjusted price-to-earnings ratio

== Other uses ==
- Kvutzat Shiller, a kibbutz in central Israel
- "Shiller", a 2008 single by Ratatat

== See also ==
- Schiller (disambiguation)
