= Hans Schuler =

American sculptor (1874–1951)

- Born: May 25, 1874; Morange, Alsace-Lorraine, German Empire
- Died: March 30, 1951 (aged 77); Baltimore, Maryland, United States
- Education: Académie Julian; Rinehart School of Sculpture; Maryland Institute College of Art
- Known for: Sculpture
- Awards: Salon Gold Medal 1901 (First American recipient)

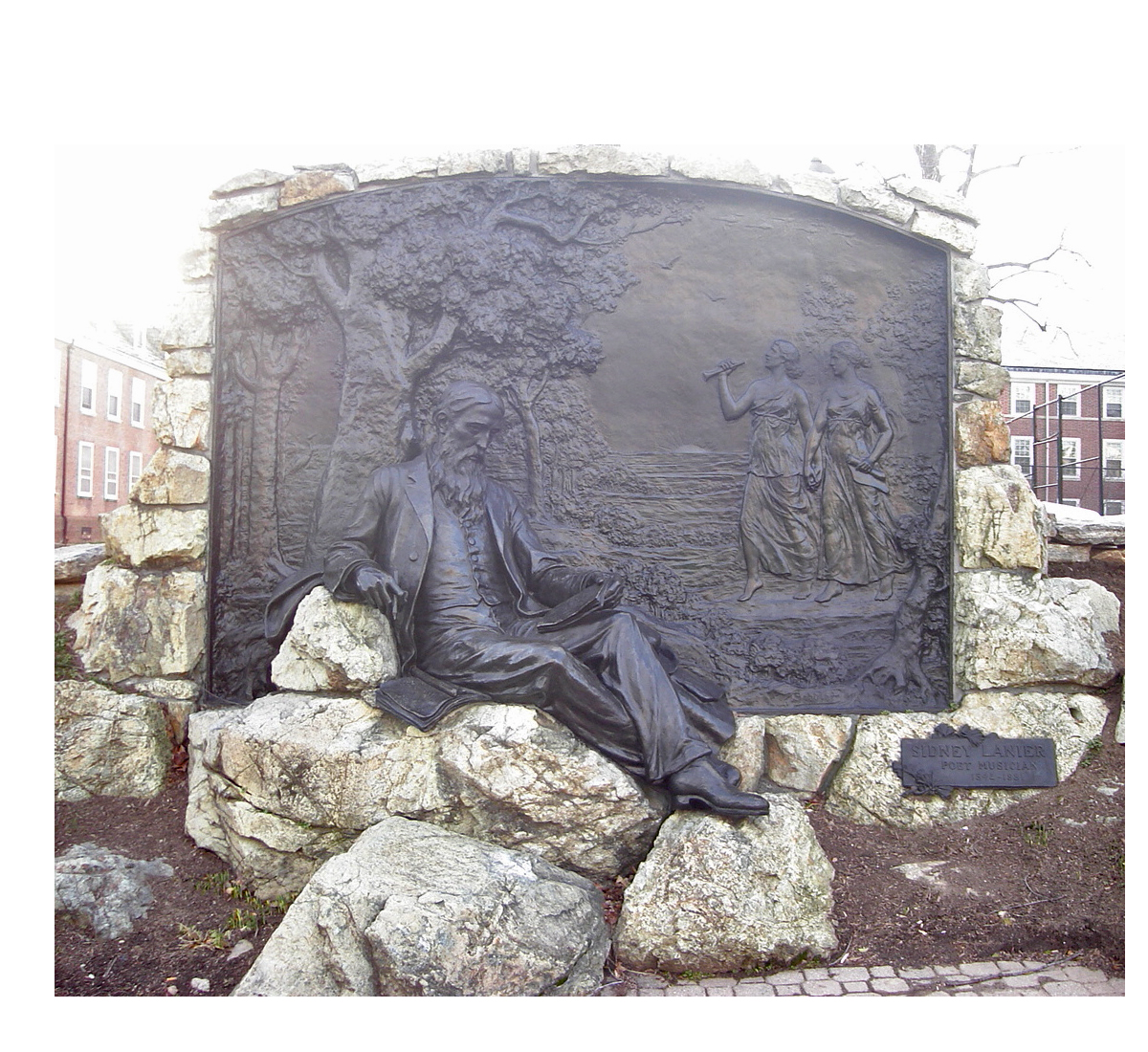
Hans Schuler's monument in Baltimore honoring poet and musician Sidney Lanier. According to the Smithsonian archive (see external links), the monument dates from 1941, was dedicated in 1942, and measures approximately 126 x 168 x 99 inches.

Hans K. Schuler (May 25, 1874 – March 30, 1951) was a German-born American sculptor and monument maker. He was the first American sculptor to win the Salon Gold Medal. His works are in several important museum collections, and he also created many public monuments, mostly for locations in Baltimore, Maryland and in the Washington, D.C. area. For over a quarter of a century he served as president of the Maryland Institute College of Art.

== Life and work ==
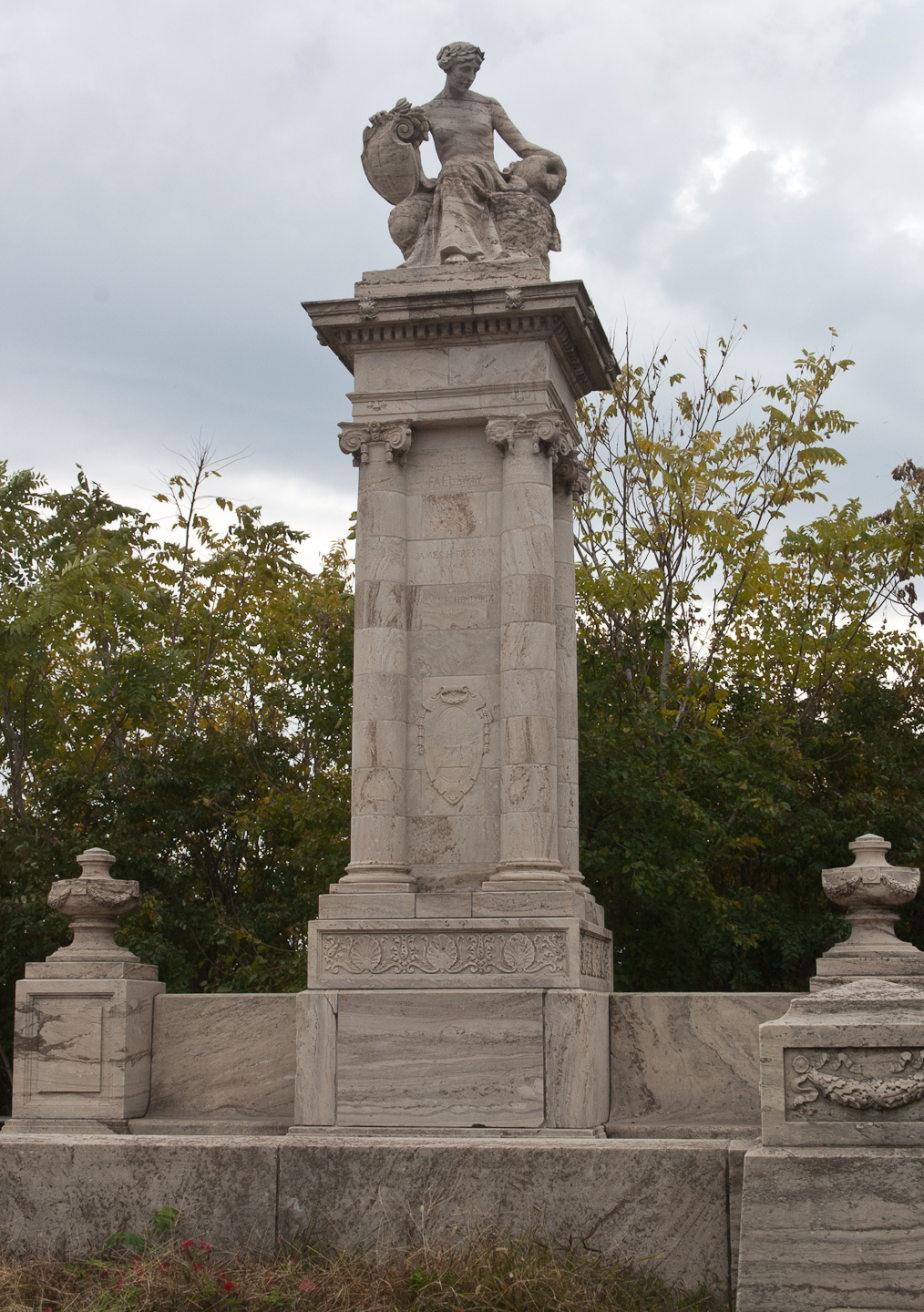
The Fallsway Fountain in collaboration with the architect Theodore Wells Pietsch

Hans Schuler was born in a part of Alsace-Lorraine which was then under German sovereignty, though it is now part of France. Schuler's family emigrated to the United States while he was still a youngster. He graduated from the Maryland Institute College of Art (MICA) in Baltimore, Maryland, having studied there at the Rinehart School of Sculpture.

He continued his artistic training in France at the Académie Julian, studying under Raoul Verlet. Schuler won the Salon Gold Medal in Paris in 1901, the first American sculptor ever to do so. Returning to Baltimore, he built his studio at 7 East Lafayette Avenue in 1906, residing and working in Baltimore for the rest of his life. Schuler served as president of MICA from 1925 to 1951 and was a member of the Charcoal Club of Baltimore. His works are in the collections of museums including the National Gallery of Art in Washington, DC and the Walters Art Museum in Baltimore. His Baltimore studio is still in use as the Schuler School of Fine Arts, founded in 1959 by sculptor Hans C. Schuler (1912–1999), the son of Hans K. Schuler. The Hans Schuler Studio and Residence was added to the National Register of Historic Places in 1985.

Schuler's sculptures and monuments grace many public places. Among them is the James Buchanan Memorial in Meridian Hill Park in Washington, D.C. It is the only public memorial dedicated to U.S. president James Buchanan. On Baltimore's Charles Street, in the area of the main campus of Johns Hopkins University, there are also imposing monuments by Schuler honoring Johns Hopkins and Sidney Lanier. All three of these monuments are large bronzes occupying elaborate stone placements. Schuler's sculptures and reliefs also adorn the interiors of many public buildings. For example, Schuler, along with sculptor J. Maxwell Miller, created a large relief panel which is located in the main concert hall at the Peabody Conservatory in Baltimore.

While Hans Schuler created many public monuments, he also created extremely sensual examples of free sculpture, including a life-sized and very lifelike marble nude – now at the Walters Art Museum – representing the abandoned Ariadne, writhing in sadness and longing. Below is a link to an image and auction record of another Schuler piece of this type, recently sold at Christie's in London.

Other works by Schuler can be found at St. Mary's College of Maryland, Arlington National Cemetery, National Portrait Gallery, Fogg Art Museum, Peabody Institute, Johns Hopkins University, Maryland Historical Society, University of Virginia, St. John's College (Annapolis, Maryland), Louisiana State University, State University of New York, (Albany and Bronx), Lutheran Theological Seminary at Gettysburg, PA and in various parks in the Baltimore and Washington D.C. area. He is buried in Loudon Park National Cemetery.

Schuler was a member of the National Sculpture Society and exhibited in their 1923 exhibition.

Schuler also taught at the Corcoran School of Art, where his pupils included Mary Blackford Fowler.

== Baltimore monuments ==
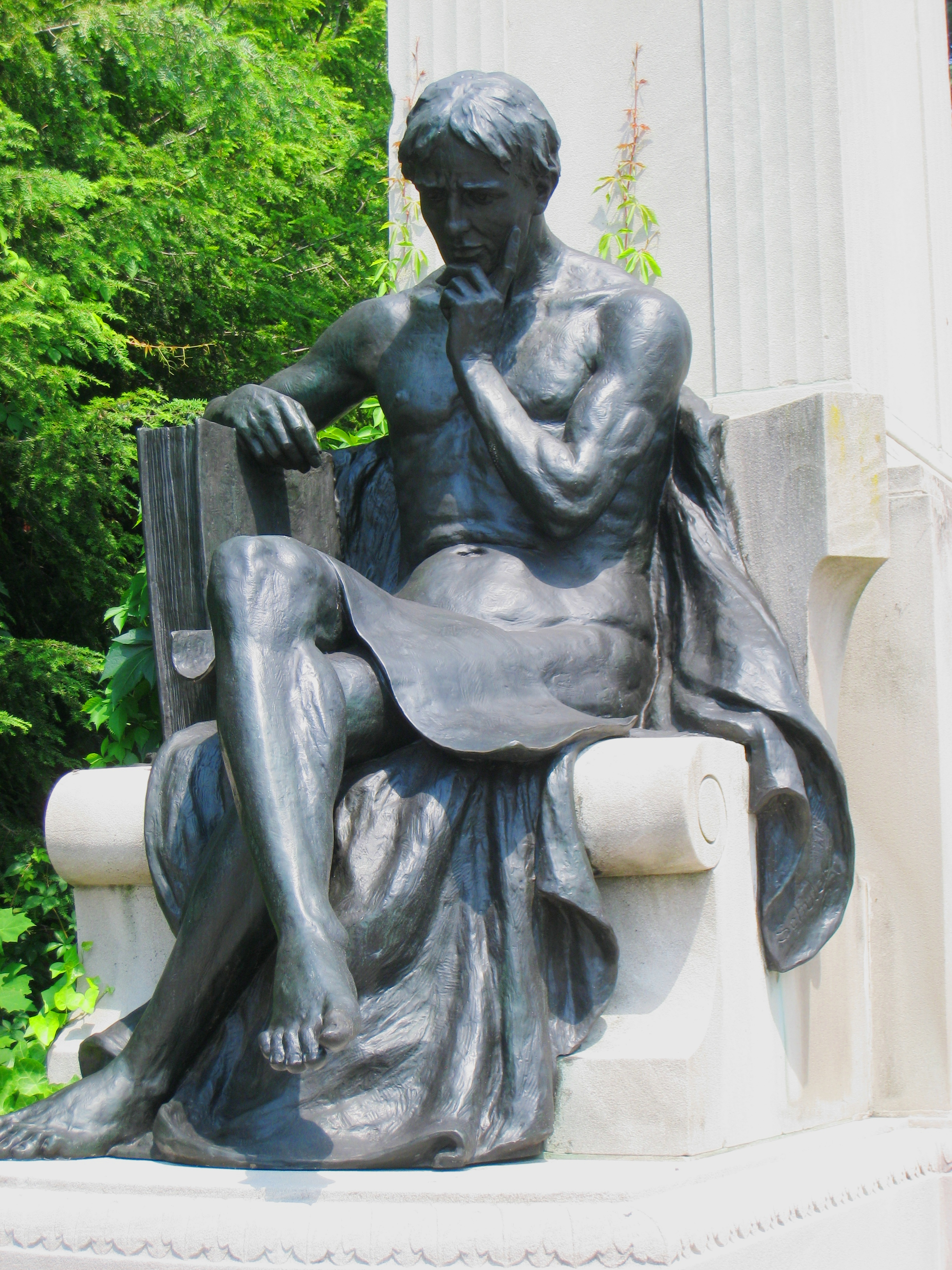
Johns Hopkins monument in Baltimore.

Schuler was known as "Baltimore's Monument Maker" after creating many of the city's monuments on streets and parks. Some of these include:

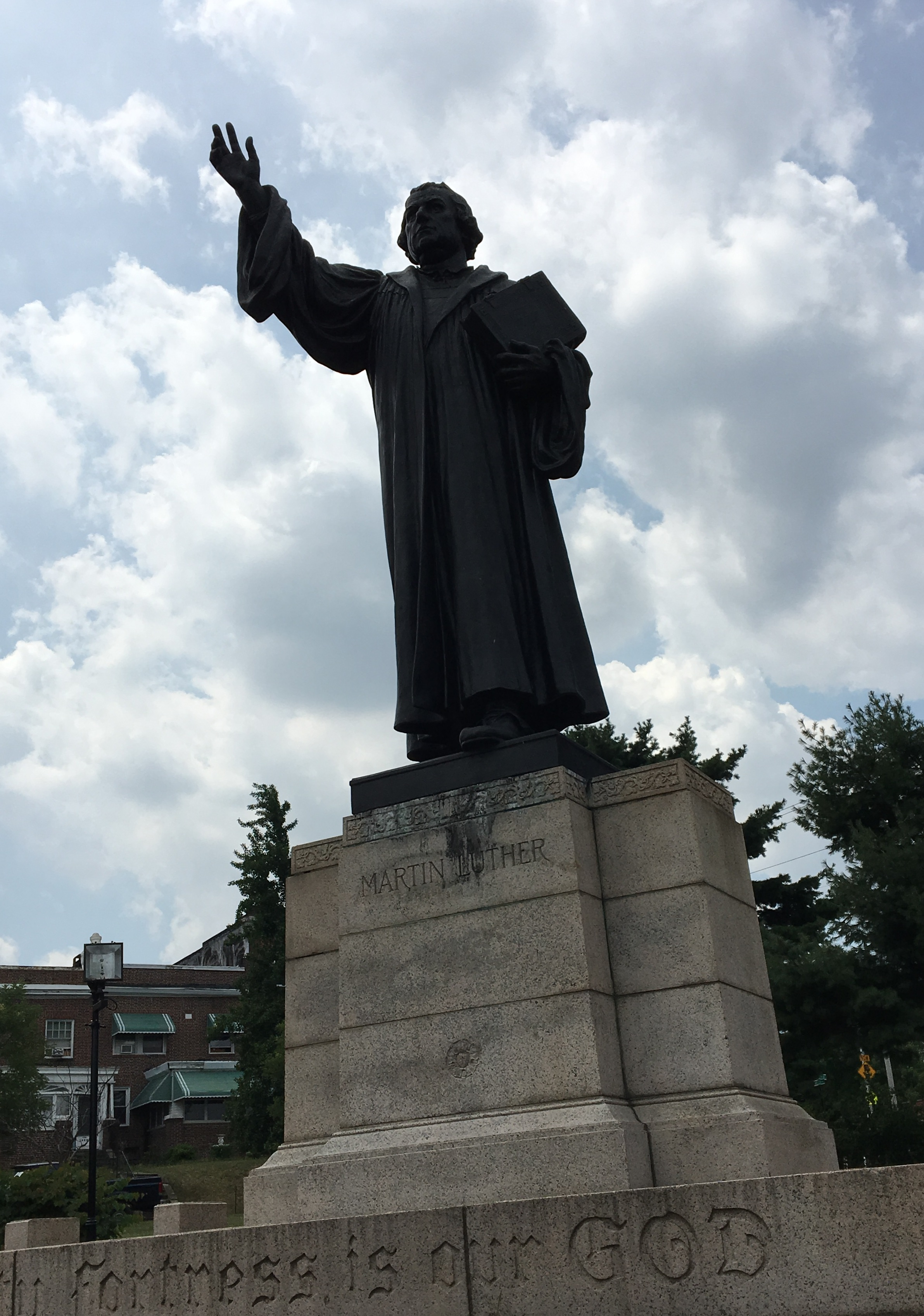
Statue of Martin Luther by Hans Schuler at Lake Montebello, Baltimore, Md.

- Martin Luther Monument, originally located at Druid Hill Park; now at Lake Montebello
- Casimir Pulaski Monument, Patterson Park
- Johns Hopkins Monument, Johns Hopkins University
- Sidney Lanier Memorial, Johns Hopkins University
- Samuel Smith Monument, Federal Hill Park
- Francis Scott Key Marker, Mount Vernon
- Fallsway Fountain, Mount Vernon
- To the Glory of Maryland, Maryland National Guard

== Cemetery monuments ==
Riggs Memorial in Green Mount Cemetery, Baltimore, with bronze sculpture by Hans Schuler

Like many of the successful sculptors of his day, Schuler created quite a few cemetery memorials. Many of these sculptures are life-sized or even larger than life-sized bronze human figures. Often the figures sit or sprawl across the tombstones in an attitude of grief, nostalgia, pensiveness, or anguish, like fellow mourners at the grave, or ghosts sociably mingling with the living, instead of being perched neatly on pedestals. The Riggs memorial, shown at right, is a good example. The Lanier monument pictured above, while not being a cemetery sculpture, also exemplifies Schuler's knack for presenting figures in this way. Most of the cemetery pieces are located in and around Baltimore. They include:

- Key Memorial, Cathedral Cemetery
- Hinrich Memorial, Druid Ridge Cemetery
- Gail Memorial, Druid Ridge Cemetery
- Schmidt Memorial, Druid Ridge Cemetery
- Wagner-Lawyer Memorial, Druid Ridge Cemetery
- Coates Memorial, Druid Ridge Cemetery
- Baetjer Memorial, Green Mount Cemetery
- Hilken Memorial, Green Mount Cemetery
- Maulsby Memorial, Green Mount Cemetery
- Riggs Memorial, Green Mount Cemetery
- Mendels Memorial, Hebrew Cemetery
- Oppenheim Memorial, Hebrew Cemetery
- Krug Memorial, Loudon Park Cemetery
- Husted Memorial, Loudon Park Cemetery
- Nitze Memorial, Loudon Park Cemetery
- Kaiser Memorial, Loudon Park Cemetery
- Newcomes Memorial, Woodlawn Cemetery
- Winslow Memorial, Lakeview Cemetery Brockport, NY
- Fisher Memorial, Ashland Cemetery, Ashland KY

== Coins ==
Schuler designed the 1934 United States commemorative Maryland Tercentenary half dollar.

== See also ==
- Maryland Institute College of Art
- Hans Schuler Studio and Residence
