= Kyla Schuller =

Kyla Schuller is an academic and author who is employed by Rutgers University.

== Works ==
- Schuller, Kyla (2018). The Biopolitics of Feeling: Race, Sex, and Science in the Nineteenth Century. Duke University Press. ISBN 978-0-8223-7235-6.
- Schuller, Kyla (2021). The Trouble with White Women: A Counterhistory of Feminism. PublicAffairs. ISBN 978-1-64503-688-3.
