= Schiller Park =

Schiller Park may refer to:

- Schiller Park, Buffalo, New York, a neighborhood in Buffalo, New York
- Schiller Park, Columbus, Ohio, a park located within German Village in Columbus, Ohio
- Schiller Park, Illinois, a city in Illinois
  - Schiller Park station, the railway station of Schiller Park, Illinois
- Schiller Park, Syracuse, New York, a neighborhood park on the Northside of Syracuse, New York
