= Charles Peter Schuler =

American politician (1861–1939)

Charles Peter Schuler (December 12, 1861 – January 11, 1939) was an American businessman and politician.

Schuler was born in Buffalo County, Wisconsin and went to the public schools. He lived in Winona, Minnesota with his wife and family and was involved with the bakery and grocery businesses. Schuler served in the Minnesota House of Representatives in 1911 and 1912 and was a Democrat.
