= Warwick Schiller =

Australian horse trainer

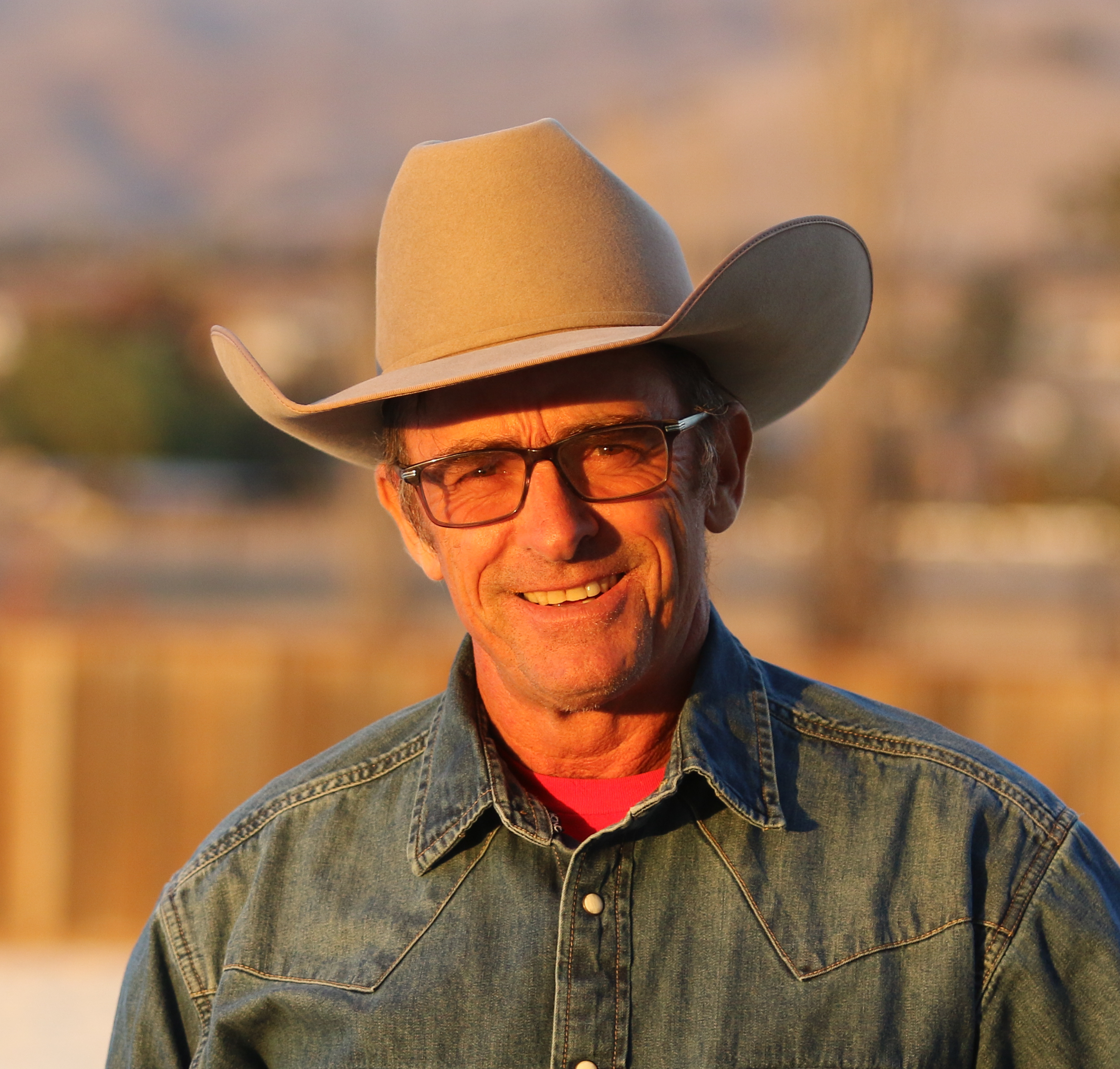
- Warwick at his ranch in California, 2020
- Born: Young, New South Wales, Australia
- Occupations: Horse Trainer; Author; Podcaster
- Notable work: The Principles of Training
- Spouse: Robyn Schiller (married 1994–present)
- Website: warwickschiller.com

Warwick Schiller is a horse trainer, author, and podcaster who was born in Young, New South Wales, Australia. After moving to the United States to begin training horses, he became an NRHA (National Reining Horse Association) Reserve World Champion. He also represented Australia at the 2010 & 2018 World Equestrian Games. His training philosophy combines natural horsemanship with elements of psychology and mindfulness.

== Early life and career ==
Warwick grew up on a 1,200-acre sheep and wheat farm in Young, New South Wales, Australia. His father, Ray Schiller, was a rodeo champion and talented bull rider. Warwick began riding horses at age six, and he showed at Quarter Horse shows throughout his childhood. After visiting America in 1990, Warwick ended up working under NRCHA Hall of Famer Don Murphy. He met his wife, Robyn, at a horse show in California.

Schiller became an independent reining horse trainer in 1995. His accomplishments include the NRHA Reserve World Champion in 2002 and wins at the major reining horse shows, including the NRHA Futurity, NRHA Derby, National Reining Breeder’s Classic, and All American Quarter Horse Congress.

Both Warwick and his wife Robyn represented Team Australia in the 2018 FEI World Equestrian Games

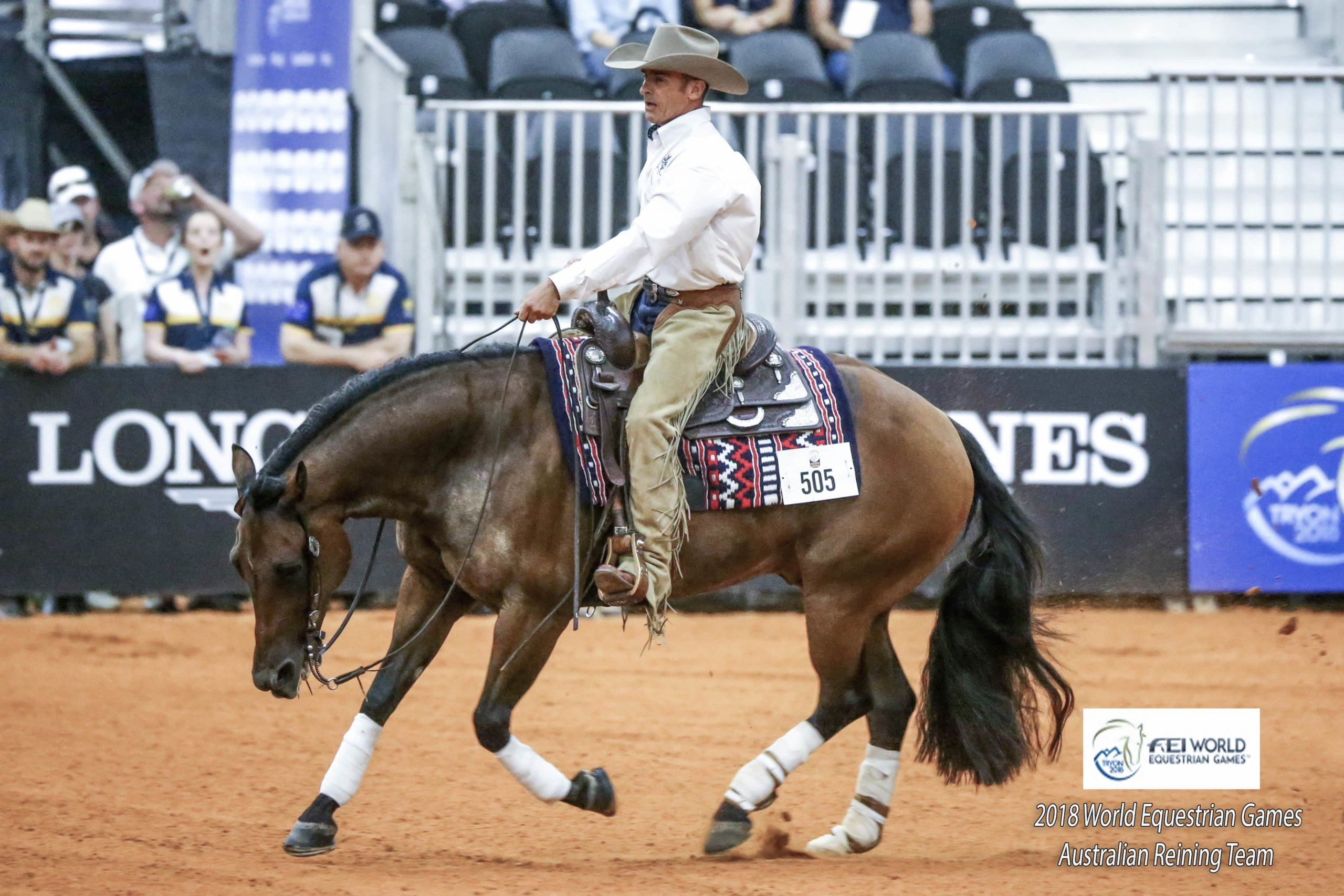
Warwick showing Plenty of Guns (Petey) at the 2018 FEI World Equestrian Games in Tryon, North Carolina

Schiller eventually began making online horse training videos on YouTube in 2011 and transitioned away from training reining horses. After gaining a following on social media, Schiller began to present at numerous horse-related expos, such as Equitana, Western States Horse Expo, and the Midwest Horse Fair.

In 2020, he started The Journey On Podcast, discussing his horse training career and personal life. Since its inception, it has had over 2.9 million downloads

He published his first book, The Principles of Training, in 2023, which documents the 13 foundational principles of all horsemanship techniques.

== Horsemanship philosophy ==
Warwick's horsemanship is rooted in psychology and understanding the mammalian nervous system states. His work often revolves around the Polyvagal Theory, which pertains to the vagus nerve's role in emotional regulation, social connection, and fear responses. Using somatic techniques to alleviate fear and anxiety, Schiller takes an empathetic approach to horse training by understanding how the horse feels at any given moment.
