= Iosif Sklyar =

Revolutionary

Iosif Shimonovich Sklyar (Russian: Иосиф Шимонович Скляр - d. 1919) was a Bolshevik revolutionary. He was a key leader of the Bolsheviks in southern Ukraine.

Sklyar joined the Russian Social Democratic Labour Party in 1903.

Following the February Revolution he emerged as one of the main leaders of the Bolshevik Party in Nikolayev. In 1917 he became the chairman of the Nikolayev City Committee of the Bolshevik Party. Sklyar was one of the prominent leaders of the Nikolayev Metal Workers Union, a union that brought together some 13,000 workers. He was elected to the Russian Constituent Assembly from the Kherson constituency in late 1917. In January 1918 he presided over the Nikolayev Provincial Congress of Soviets of Workers and Soldiers Deputies as its chairman, and was elected by the congress as the chairman of the Provincial Executive Committee. In January 1919 Sklyar was sent as the representative of the Soviet Ukrainian government to build Bolshevik organizations and revolutionary committees in the Kherson region, an area engulfed in civil war. Sklyar was killed in Kozlovo village, Nikolayev district, in the summer of 1919 during confrontations with Nykyfor Hryhoriv's forces.
