= Schuller =

Schuller is a surname. Notable people with the surname include:

- Bobby Schuller (born 1981), televangelist, son of Robert A.
- Ed Schuller (born 1955), musician
- Eugène Schueller (1881–1957), founder of L'Oréal
- George Schuller (born 1958), musician
- Gunther Schuller (1925–2015), musician
- Heidi Schüller (born 1950), athlete
- Ivan K. Schuller, physicist
- Kyla Schuller, academic and author
- Lea Schüller (born 1997), German footballer
- Rasmus Schüller (born 1991), Finnish footballer
- Robert A. Schuller (born 1954), televangelist, son of Robert H.
- Robert H. Schuller (1926–2015), televangelist
- Sébastien Schuller (born 1970), French singer
- Tom Schueller, politician
- Wendy Schuller, American basketball coach

== Fictional Characters ==
- Christina Schuller, a cast member on the TV Series Laguna Beach

== See also ==
- Schuler, surname
- Schouweiler, Luxemburg
- Schüller, Germany
- Schull (disambiguation)
