= Eduardo Schilling (businessman) =

German gunsmith and businessman (1852-1925)

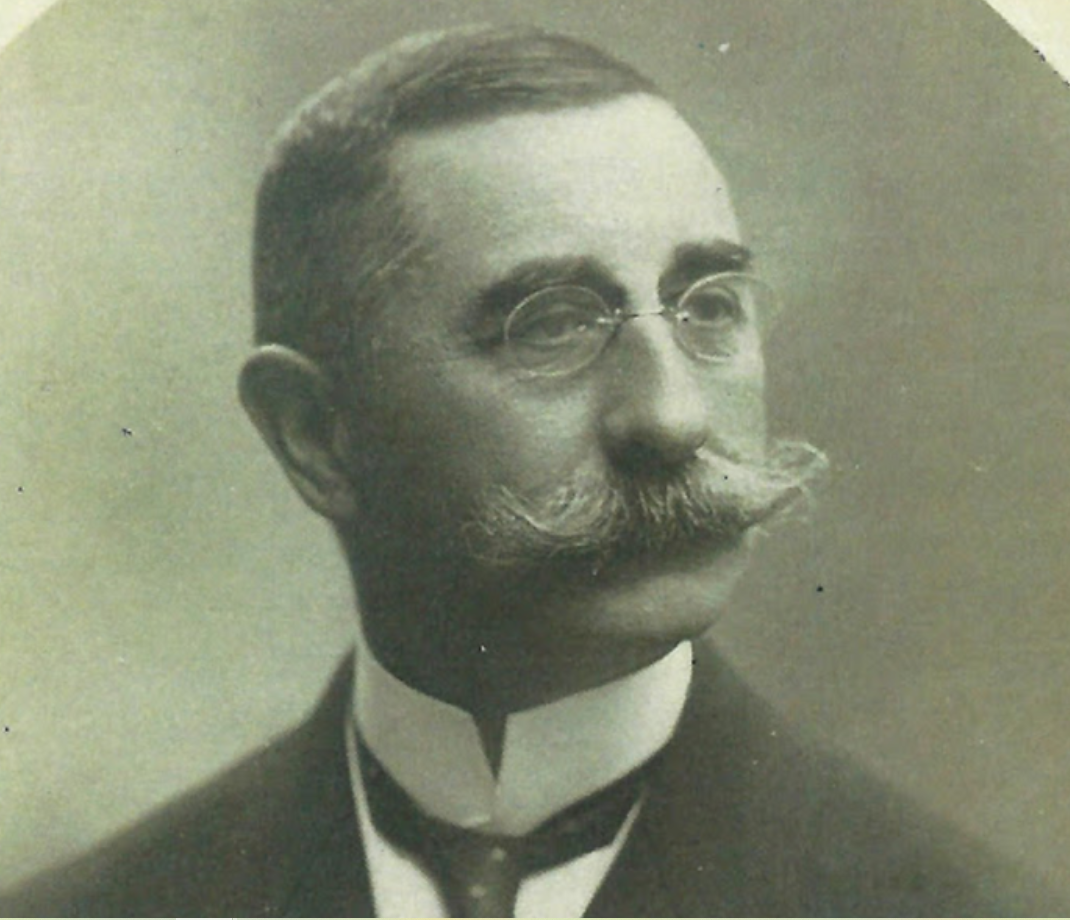
- Eduardo María Schilling
- Born: Eduardo Maria Schilling Monfort; 14 October 1852; Waldshut, Grand Duchy of Baden, Germany
- Died: 13 November 1925 (aged 73); Barcelona, Catalonia, Spain
- Citizenship: German
- Occupations: Gunsmith; Businessman
- Children: Eduardo Schilling

Eduardo Maria Schilling Monfort (14 October 1852 – 13 November 1925) was a German gunsmith and businessman. He became a weapons manufacturer when he founded a factory of such in Eibar in 1893, and then in Barcelona in 1896, becoming a distinguished representative of the Barcelona economy. His best well-known product was the Jabalí brand shotguns, which had no rival in Spain and competed with the best English brands.

His son of the same name played in the first-ever match of FC Barcelona in 1899, but due to a mistake that has persisted through time, Schilling is often wrongly credited with being the one who played for Barça, at the age of 47.

== Early life and education ==
Eduardo Schilling was born on 14 October 1852 in the Waldshut district, Grand Duchy of Baden, as the son of a Jewish family who had converted to Catholicism, formed by his parents Johann Nepomuck Schilling and Maria Anna Montfort (1833–1871), and two brothers, Anna Maria and Karl Frederik.

Schilling developed a deep interest in gunsmith from an early age, but his father, a high-ranking judicial official who held a public office in the court of Baden, wanted him to become something more. Schilling, however, proved to be determined and rebellious, and in 1870, he emigrated (or fled) to Liège, where he became an apprentice in the biggest gunsmithing center in Continental Europe, and only behind those of Great Britain. He learned all about his trade in Belgium, which is why he never imprinted German or Austrian characteristics on any of his weapons. According to some sources, he also spent some time in England, and in fact, some publications described him as a "nationalized" English.

== Professional career ==
=== First steps in Spain ===
At some point in the mid-1870s, Schilling moved to Eibar in the Basque Country, where he became a gunsmith in the middle of the Third Carlist War (1872–76). While in Eibar, he began making weapons for Luís Vives Torrabadella, a Catalan businessman who owned the Luís Vives Armería-Quicallería, a "Great armory and quincallería" store established on Fernando VII Street in 1859, that was specialized in the sale of inexpensive items, such as Sandow Dumbbells, as well as hunting equipment and camping products, but the store was also the warehouse of the Toledo Artillery Factory, so it soon developed an immense stock of shotguns, revolvers, and cartridges, including a percussion dueling pistol in 1870. When the war ended in 1876, he moved to Sant Martí de Provençals in Barcelona, where Schilling, who demonstrated a vigorous business character throughout his life, proposed to Don Luís something more serious than a mere supplier-client business relationship, in the sense of starting something together.

In the following year, in 1877, Schilling married Ramona Vives Vives, the daughter of Luís, and the couple had six children, Luis, who died in 1880, Eduardo, Carmen (1898–1922), Pilar, Francisca, and Mercedes. Their eldest surviving son Eduardo abandoned his industrial engineering career before 1900 to join his father's company. His youngest son, Ramón, died in 1913, at the age of 9, and his daughter Maria del Carmen died in 1922, at the age of 24.

=== Distribution ===
Due to his increasing role within Vives' company and his newly founded status as his son-in-law, Vives decided to make him his partner, and thus, in July 1883, the Luís Vives Armería-Quicallería was accordingly renamed as Luís Vives y Cía (Inc), with Schilling being the Inc. From the mid-1880s onwards, they became the largest distributor in Spain of hunting, fishing, camping, travel and other items and products. One such product was folding wooden chairs with a handle to make transporting it more bearable while hunting.

=== Manufacturing (Eibar) ===
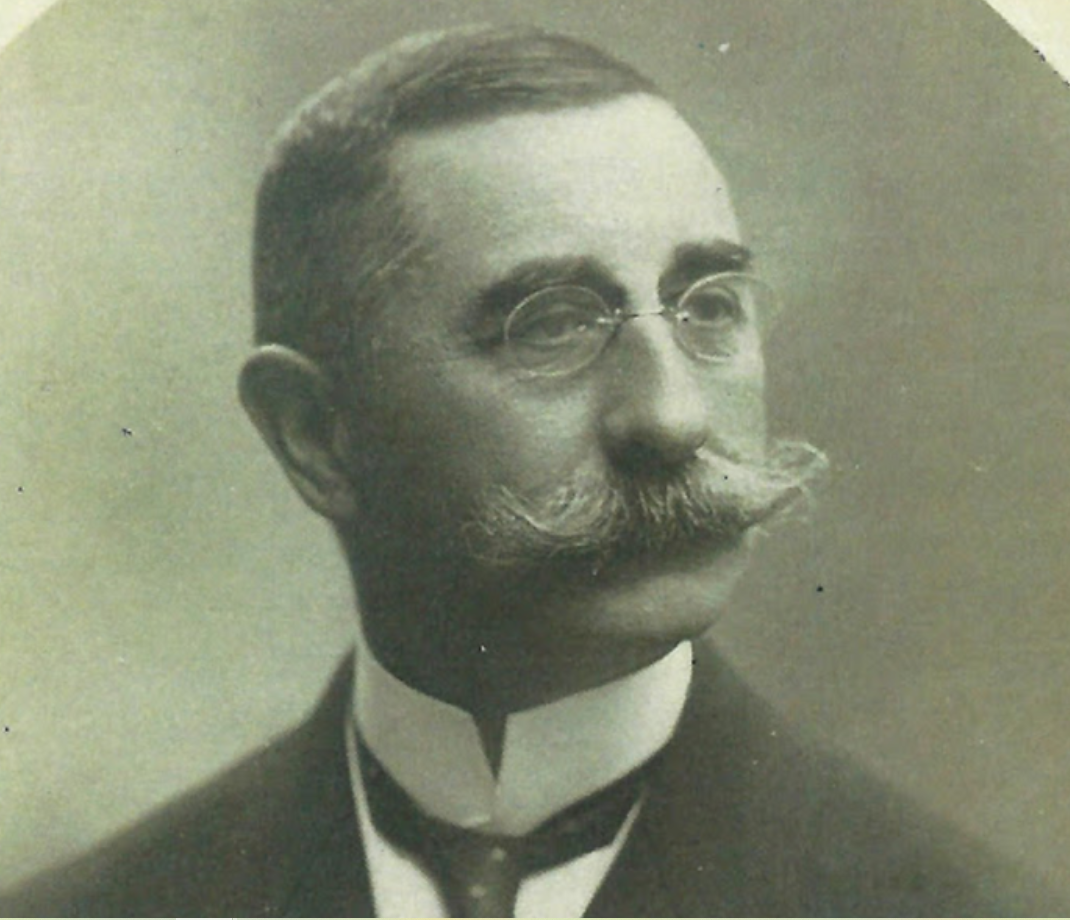
Eduardo Schilling.

Unlike the rest of Spain, Schilling's weapons were taken from high-end Belgian and English models, perhaps from Auguste Lebeau and Westley Richards, which distinguished his company from the other weapons manufacturers of that time. Besides Schilling, however, Vives only had one other gunmaker, having to import the other firearms from Belgium, France, England, and even North America. Given the entrepreneurial nature of Schilling, he intended to provide his father-in-law's distribution company with his own manufacturing, and thus, in 1893, he founded a weapons factory in Eibar, where he still had connections from his previous tenure there, and then on 18 December, he registered the first brand of shotguns in Spain: "Jabalí", which would then be commercialized by Luís Vives y Cía, thus officially establishing himself as a weapons manufacturer. The idea of having a brand of their own seems to have been his priority, something that could only be acquired in the gunsmith centers, where this was mandatory.

As the manager of the Eibar factory, Schilling took charge of the recruitment of workers, both locals and foreign, declaring 4 workers in 1894, and then 27 in 1895. It seems that his intentions with this short period in Eibar were merely to gather human material to establish his own factory in Barcelona, especially because the region's gun-making market was already filled by the prestigious Victor Sarasqueta and other prominent master gunsmiths of Eibar, who saw Schilling as an "intruder", and began halting him by recruiting his best employees. So, in 1896, he left Eibar with an undetermined number of workers to settle them in the facilities owned by Luis Vives in Sant Martí de Provençals. Among these workers who accompanied him, there were Miguel Aguirre and Nicolás Aranzábal, two young gunsmiths from Eibar who had decided to perfect their skills under the guidance of Schilling, who apparently taught them well, as they went on to create the ''Aguirre y Aranzábal'' in 1915, better known as AYA shotguns. Furthermore, there was also the master gunsmith and future business partner Pedro Paguaga, which he had met in the gunsmith centers in 1894.

=== Partnership with Paguaga (El Poblenou) ===
Shortly after returning to Barcelona in 1896, Schilling and Vives began building a factory in El Poblenou, doing so by renting a warehouse that was then repurposed as a factory, which was opened as Eduardo Schilling, Weapons Manufacturer and which began production of the Jabalí shotguns with about 40 Basque workers (mostly from Eibar), but by 1904, it already had between 90 and 100 employees, neither Basque nor foreign, but from Catalonia itself. In 1900, Schilling partnered with Pedro Paguaga to establish the E. Schilling y P. Paguaga, S en C, which became the new owners of the factory in El Poblenou, before moving into a new factory, this one was purposely built. Paguaga, single and without commitment, contributed one hundred thousand pesetas to the society in 1900 alone, while Schilling contributed only ten percent of that figure, which is not surprising, given that he had invested a lot in the construction of the El Poblenou factory, even if it was partly financed by his father-in-law. This meant that Schilling had, in partnership with Paguaga, his own weapons factory, and in partnership with Vives, the largest distributor in Spain of those weapons, mostly the Jabalí shotguns. Some sources have stated that the Schilling y Paguaga were the best shotguns in Spain along with the Sarasquetas, who are the only known royal gunsmiths of King Alfonso XIII.

On 15 October 1899, the Luis Vives y Cía opened a branch on Calle de Alcalá number 18, in Madrid (later number 14), but three years later, in 1902, the company ceased to exist and was renamed as Eduardo Schilling, Sociedad en Comandita, which in 1905 opened a branch on Peris y Valero street in Valencia, later La Paz street. In 1921, the Madrid branch moved from the Calle de Alcalá to the Calles del Conde de Peñalver Streets and the Calles del Caballero de Gracia.

=== Advertisement ===
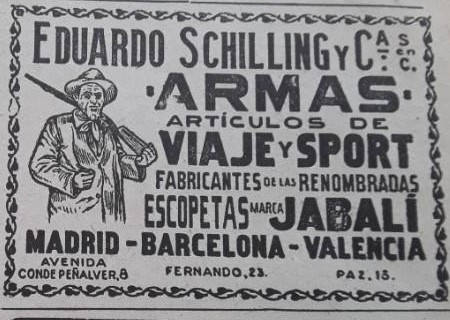
Advertisement of the Jabali shotguns from 1921.

Schilling then launched the most furious advertising campaign that any weapons manufacturing company had ever carried out at the time, announcing his articles on a daily basis and in all the publications available, including provincial newspapers, national written media, and illustrated and non-illustrated magazines that were linked with their activity. His surname was advertised daily with diverse items ranging from Gillete razors, to field capes, through saddles and a long Et cetera, but he reserves the Jabalí shotguns adverts for more special publications, such as the Alcoy newspapers La Defensa and Heraldo de Alcoy, which stated "These shotguns have no rival in Spain and compete with the best English brands". Such was his size as a manufacturer and distributor of handguns that in 1911, a group of conspirators negotiated with one of his factories in Barcelona for the supply of 500 Mauser and Winchester weapons, an event that was mentioned by Minister José Relvas in a letter to the Spanish Ministry of State on 11 December.

Advertising technique is several dozen years ahead of its time and is based on multiple techniques, such as the massive advertisement of the product in short clichés and advertising their quincallería products in elaborate clichés with details that were considered luxury to attract attention. Other techniques included the punctual launch of advertising with the appearance of news, advertisements of medium or extensive writing, some of which are two pages long, in which the technical advances, the luxury or the dimensions of the facilities are described. These particular clichés were actually created by the company, probably by Schilling himself, and only sent to important publications.

=== Expanding the Jabalí brand with foreign models ===
In 1906, Schilling registered 15 brands that would be used to name the different models of Jabalí brand shotguns, some of which had already been used since the end of the century: San Huberto, San Eustaquio, Diana, La Especial, La Favorita, La Nemrod, La Continental, La Victoria, La Campeón, La Pluma, La Española, La Colonial, La Javelina, Royal Guality, and Imperial Guality. The latter three had the highest range and were the high-end models of the Jabalí brand (Anson system), and since they did not follow the pattern of the national manufacture of the time, it is unlikely that those three models were manufactured in the El Poblenou factory. For instance, La Javelinas had a couple of characteristics typical of a Belgian "box lock" shotgun, such as the convex pins of the hammers, which were not used either in England or in Spain; while the Imperial Guality was a Holland & Holland, but Schilling's shotgun had 8 pins instead of Holland's 7, so if it was manufactured in El Poblenou it is remarkable since at the time, no other Spanish gunsmith had assembled Holland keys, much less with that variant.

Whether or not these weapons were manufactured in El Poblenou, these three models brought great fame to Schilling and Paguaga, whose success as gunsmith businessmen became indisputable. The Jabalí shotguns were at some point totally different from what could be found in the rest of Spain, so it was easier to distinguish them from the rest. Once the brand, image, and product were created, the factory, the advertising, and the commercialization and distribution company took care of the rest. Over time, these shotgun models were reformed with tests for smokeless powder, 70 mm chambers, and ejectors. They subjected their weapons to the only tests they could (those of the house itself).

=== Decline and collapse ===
The production of Jabalí shotguns ceased in 1923, coinciding with the dissolution of the partnership he maintained with Pedro Paguaga, when their company returned to his origins under the sole name of Eduardo Schilling, and also coinciding with the uprising of the then Captain General Miguel Primo de Rivera, who establish martial law in 1923, which halted the business of selling shotguns, although they continued or even intensified those of handguns.

== Other activities ==
In 1882, Schilling became a member of the Barcelona Athenaeum.

In 1894, he registered two invention patents on short weapons.

In 1896, Schilling registered three products without a denomination (PS, P E.S. and E-P-S), which were well-considered and designed variations of stitching awls, with the second awl having the flag of Liège while the third had the Coat of arms of Barcelona of the 1890s, a bat on the crown and the crossed arms.

In 1897, he formed another brand, El Cisne (the Swan brand), although some sources state that this was the El Pelícano brand (the Pelican brand). What appears in the design is neither a swan nor a pelican, but a heron.

Schilling participated in the Hispano-French Exposition of 1908 and the Exposición Internacional del Centenario in Buenos Aires in 1910.

In 1912, he registered the gun brands ES, Handy, and Victoria y Sandow, and in the following year, in 1913, he introduced a patent on a fly-swatting device, and registered the gun brands Record, Victor, and Victoria; the latter trademark was registered by Esperanza y Unceta in January 1912, but only one year later the same trademark was granted to Schilling on May 1913, which caused a conflict between both companies.

== Sporting career ==
At some point, Schilling was a member of the Hiking Club of Catalonia, in which some of his children also took part. He was also a member of Gimnasio Solé.

On 8 December 1899, his 16-year-old son started for FC Barcelona in their first-ever match, but due to a mistake that has persisted through time, the father Schilling is often wrongly credited with being the one who played for Barça. This is highly unlikely due to his advanced age of 47, which would make him the oldest-ever first-team player in the history of Barcelona, albeit not in an official match.

In 1912, Schilling introduced a patent on elastic cords for gymnastic exercises.

== Death ==
Schilling died in Barcelona on 13 November 1925, at the age of 73. He remained active in his later years, working until just months before his death since in 1925, he registered a patent on a plate throwing device.

== Legacy ==
After he died, Eduardo Jr. took over his companies, but the many social upheavals during the dictatorship of Primo de Rivera led to the sale of the company in 1929. Before its definitive sale (1930) to the company Armas y Accesorios de Tiro y Caza, Eduardo Schilling became Schilling Sociedad Anónima and reactivated the production of shotguns despite already being aware of their impending stock liquidation, which happened a few months later.
