= Hans Schuler Studio and Residence =

Historic house and studio in Baltimore, Maryland

- U.S. National Register of Historic Places
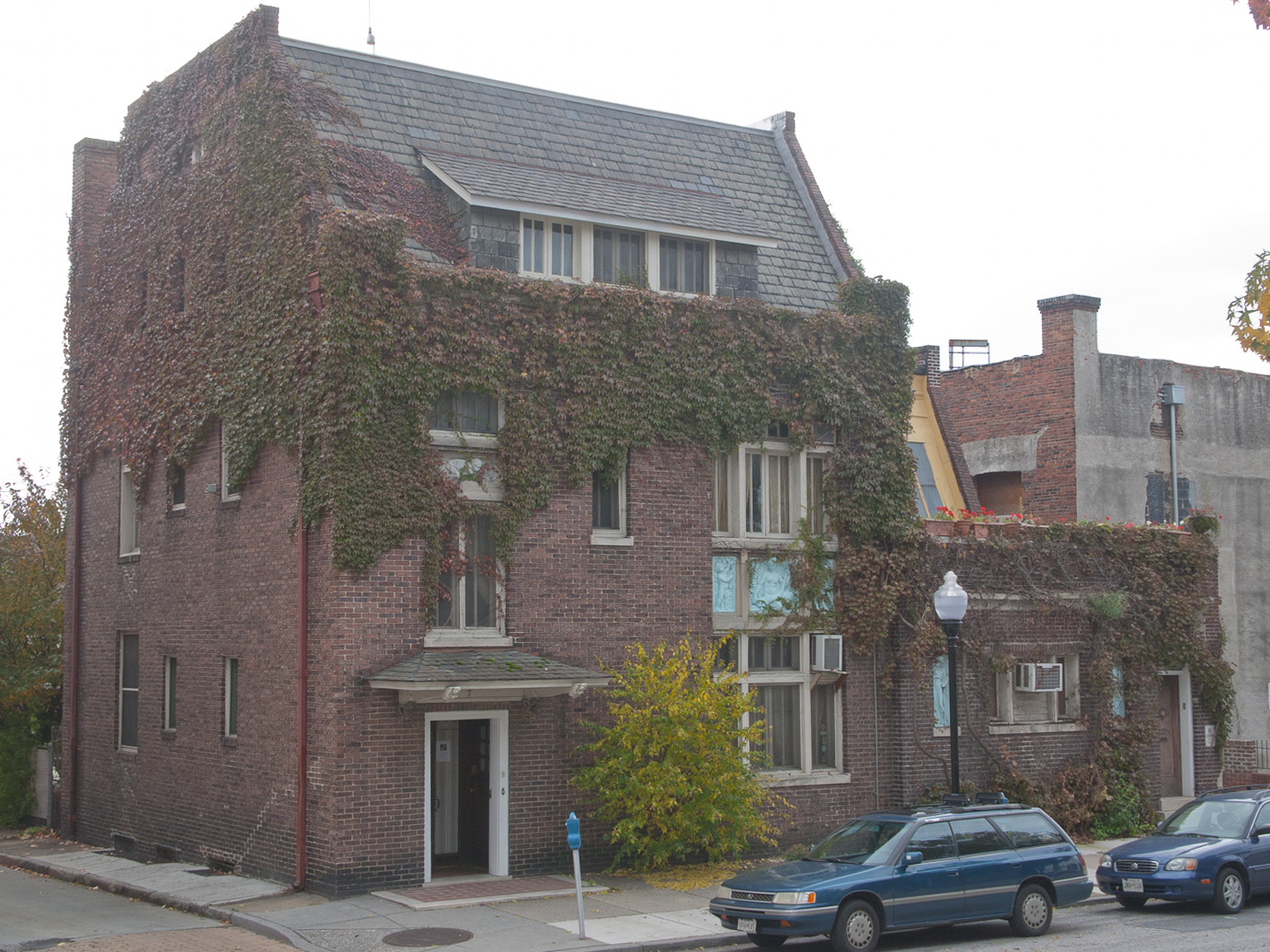
- Hans Schuler Studio and Residence, November 2008

- Location within Baltimore Location within Maryland Location within the United States
- Location: 5 East Lafayette Ave., Baltimore, Maryland
- Coordinates: 39°18′34.5″N 76°36′57″W
- Area: less than one acre
- Built: 1906
- Architect: Sill, Howard; Beecher, Gordon
- NRHP reference No.: 85002510
- Added to NRHP: September 27, 1985

The Hans Schuler Studio and Residence is a historic home and artist studio located at Baltimore, Maryland, United States. It is an eclectic brick building constructed in two stages. The studio is one story high with a recessed skylight, and was designed by Baltimore architect Howard Sill and constructed in 1906; the residence is two stories tall plus a high, steep mansard story which was added in 1912. It combines elements from various fashionable styles and incorporating as ornament the work of sculptor Hans Schuler (1874–1951), for whom the building was constructed. It currently houses The Schuler School of Fine Arts and The Schuler Gallery.

The Hans Schuler Studio and Residence was listed on the National Register of Historic Places in 1985.
