= Sklyarov =

Sklyarov (Russian: Скляров) is a surname of Russian origin. People with this name include:

- Aleksandr Valeryevich Sklyarov (born 1971), is a former Kazakhstani football player.
- Andrei Vladimirovich Sklyarov (born 1989), is a Russian professional footballer.
- Dmitry Sklyarov (born 1974), a Russian citizen employed by the Russian company ElcomSoft
- Igor Sklyarov (born 1966), is a former Russian footballer.
- Ivan Sklyarov (1948–2007), was a Russian politician.
- Yuri Sklyarov (1925–2013), is a CPSU party member since 1944, a candidate member of the Central Committee (1981-1989), Deputy of the Supreme Soviet of the USSR 11 convocation.
