= Eduardo Schilling (footballer) =

German footballer (1883–1971)

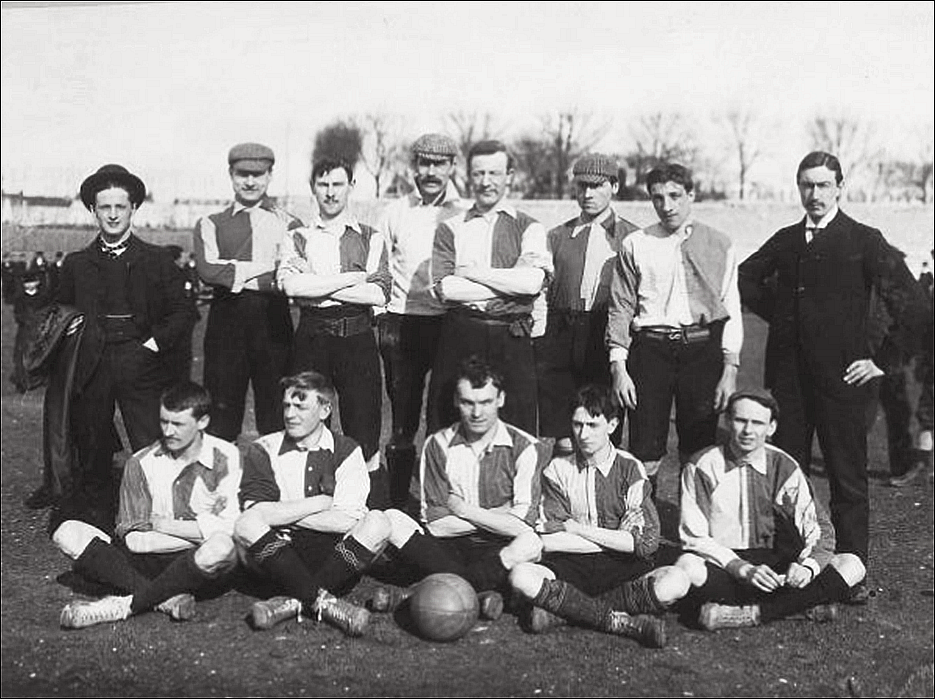
- Schilling with the United team before the 1902 Coupe Dewar final on 16 March.

Personal information
- Full name: Eduardo Schilling Vives
- Date of birth: 25 March 1883
- Place of birth: Barcelona, Catalonia, Spain
- Date of death: 1 February 1971 (aged 87)
- Place of death: Barcelona, Catalonia, Spain
- Position: Forward

Senior career*
Years	Team	Apps	(Gls)
1899	FC Barcelona	1	(0)
1902	United Sports Club		
- * Club domestic league appearances and goals

Eduardo Schilling Vives (25 March 1883 – 1 February 1971) was a German footballer who played as a forward for FC Barcelona in the club's very first match in 1899, at the age of 16.

== Early life ==
Eduardo Schilling was born in Barcelona on 25 March 1883, as the second son of Ramona Vives Vives and Eduardo Schilling Monfort, a German gunsmith.

== Sporting career ==
Schilling was not one of the twelve founders of FC Barcelona on 29 November 1899, but just a few days later, on 8 December, he featured as a forward in their first-ever match, a friendly against the city's English colony known as Team Anglès at the Velódromo de la Bonanova. Aged 16 years, 9 months and 13 days old, Schilling was the youngest Barça player in that match, and the second-youngest of both teams only behind Stanley Charles Harris; however, due to a mistake that has persisted through time, his father is often wrongly credited with being the one who played for Barça that day, which is highly unlikely since he was already 47 at the time. The newly-founded Barça was clearly struggling to put together a team of eleven players since they only managed to gather ten players for their debut, and two of them were not even sportsmen: Schilling and Otto Künzli.

Schilling studied industrial engineering, but abandoned that career before 1900 to join his father's company, for whom he made several international trips to England, Germany, and France, and while on the latter, he briefly played for United Sports Club, starting in the final of the Coupe Dewar in 1902, which ended in a 1–0 loss to Standard AC.

== Professional career ==
Following his father's death, Schilling launched some modern, large-format advertisements in order to raise sales and offer a broader vision of what the Schilling House made available to the public, the first of which was released in the Illustrated Hunting Magazine in January 1927 and the last in January 1928. He was noted for having much less business capacity than his father, but this was probably because, unlike his father's companies, his own were not immune to the social upheavals before or during the dictatorship of Primo de Rivera. Before its definitive sale (1930) to the company Armas y Accesorios de Tiro y Caza, Eduardo Schilling became Schilling Sociedad Anónima and reactivated the production of shotguns despite already being aware of their impending stock liquidation, which happened a few months later.

== Later life and death ==
In May 1919, Schilling married Montserrat Utrillo Raymat, with whom he had two daughters, Maria Montserrat (1921–1940) and Maria Núria (1927–1938).

Schilling died in Barcelona on 1 February 1971, at the age of 87.

== Honours ==
United Sports Club

- Coupe Dewar
  - Runner-up: 1902
