= Druid Hill Park =

Urban park in Baltimore, Maryland, US

- Auchentorlie
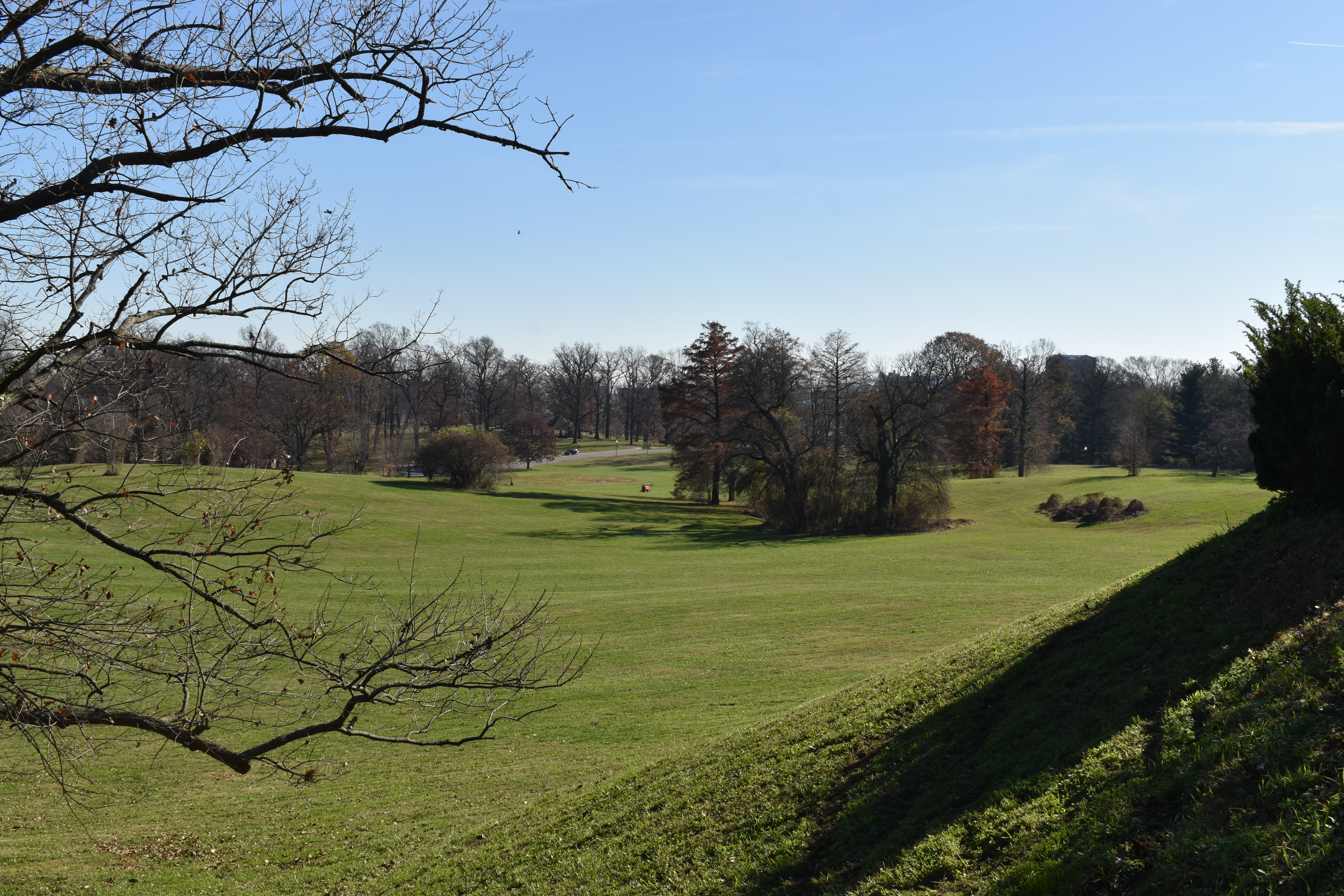
- The lawn at Druid Hill Park in Baltimore
- Interactive map of Druid Hill Park
- Location: Baltimore, Maryland, U.S.
- Created: 1860 / 1908
- Operator: Baltimore City Department of Recreation and Parks
- Druid Hill Park Historic District
- U.S. National Register of Historic Places
- U.S. Historic district
- Baltimore City Landmark
- Location: Druid Lake, Druid Hill Park, Baltimore, Maryland
- Coordinates: 39°19′23″N 76°38′41″W
- Area: 746 acres (3.02 km^{2})
- Built: 1860
- Architect: Howard Daniels, George A. Frederick (municipal architect)
- Architectural style: Late Victorian styles
- NRHP reference No.: 73002183

Significant dates
- Added to NRHP: May 22, 1973
- Designated BCL: 1975
- Website: www.druidhillpark.org

Druid Hill Park is a 745-acre (3.01 km^{2}) urban park in northwest Baltimore, Maryland, United States. Its boundaries are marked by Druid Park Drive (north), Swann Drive and Reisterstown Road (west and south), and the Jones Falls Expressway / Interstate 83 (east).

Inaugurated in 1860 under the administration of city Mayor Thomas Swann, Druid Hill Park ranks with Central Park (begun in 1858) in New York City, Fairmount Park (1812) in Philadelphia, and Golden Gate Park in San Francisco as the oldest landscaped public parks in the United States.

== History ==
The land was originally part of "Auchentorlie", the estate of Dr George Buchanan (1696–1750), one of the seven commissioners responsible for the 1729 establishment of Baltimore Town. Buchanan's country estate northwest of the town, and on the west bank and overlooking the Jones Falls stream, included 579 of the 745 acres (3.01 km^{2}) that comprise Druid Hill Park today. Renamed "Druid Hill" by Col. Nicholas Rogers, who married Eleanor Buchanan, it was purchased in 1860 by the City of Baltimore from family descendant Lloyd Rogers with municipal funds raised by the revenue derived from a one-cent park tax on the nickel horsecar fares, put through by 19th Mayor Thomas Swann. After its purchase, Druid Hill Park was inaugurated by Swann on October 19, 1860.

The park was designed by Howard Daniels, landscape designer retained by the newly created and appointed Board of Park Commissioners; and John H. B. Latrobe, who designed the gateways to the park and the alterations made to the early 19th-century Nicholas Rogers mansion that already stood in the site, later known as the "Mansion House". George A. Frederick, the Baltimore municipal architect who later won the commission for Baltimore City Hall, provided designs for architectural features in the park. Among his playful structures for Druid Hill in Moorish and Chinese styles are the Chinese Station erected in 1864 and the Moorish Station, which were stops on a narrow-gauge railroad that once wound through the park. The "Mansion House" now functions as the main administration building of the Baltimore City Zoo, founded 1876 and later renamed Maryland Zoo in Baltimore.

Like Central Park in New York City's central urban Manhattan of the 1850s designed by Frederick Law Olmsted, Druid Hill was at the northern edges of urban development at the time of its establishment. The northern end of the park, which contains some of the oldest forest growth in the state of Maryland, has never been landscaped, but rather left as a natural wooded habitat. Roadways through this section of the park have been closed to vehicular traffic since the late 1970s or early 1980s, but have always been open for hikers and bicyclists. A well-known Osage orange tree, said to be hundreds of years old, was brought down by Storm Sandy in October 2012.

The southern end of the park was a popular destination for city dwellers for a number of decades. Druid Lake, the park's most notable waterway, was constructed in 1863 and remains one of the largest earthen dammed lakes in the country. Through 2024, it serves as a reservoir for the Baltimore metropolitan area public water system, after which that function will be replaced by two large underground tanks installed in the western end of the lake. The dam was designated as a National Historic Civil Engineering Landmark by the American Society of Civil Engineers in 1971. With the advent of automobiles, the park's many winding roadways became popular with car dealers who took potential buyers there to teach them to drive.

Many of the park's older fountains and man-made ponds have been drained, allowing nature to reclaim those areas. However, many of their structures remain partially or completely intact.

Druid Hill Park was listed on the National Register of Historic Places on May 22, 1973. It is also included in the newly organized Baltimore National Heritage Area in the 2010s in cooperation with the National Park Service of the U.S. Department of the Interior.

=== Racial segregation ===
When the park first opened in 1860, a few months before the outbreak of the American Civil War, recreation facilities such as pools and tennis courts were racially segregated.

By the early 1890s, tennis had become popular in clubs around Baltimore and Washington, D.C., and at Howard University. An organization dedicated to developing black tennis players, the American Tennis Association held its first ATA National Championships in Druid Hill Park in August 1917. The events were men's and women's singles, and men's doubles.

The practice of segregation was definitively challenged on July 11, 1948, when 24 black tennis players, protesting the city's discriminatory policies, were arrested for playing on the park's "white-only" tennis courts. The names of the protestors are commemorated on the Baltimore Tennis Club marker, located adjacent to the Rawlings Conservatory glasshouse along Druid Park Lake Drive. The incident was the subject of the last public column and editorial of the famed Baltimore editor, reporter, columnist and author, H.L. Mencken, who, writing in The Baltimore Sun in 1948, condemned the city's segregationist policies.

=== Festivities ===
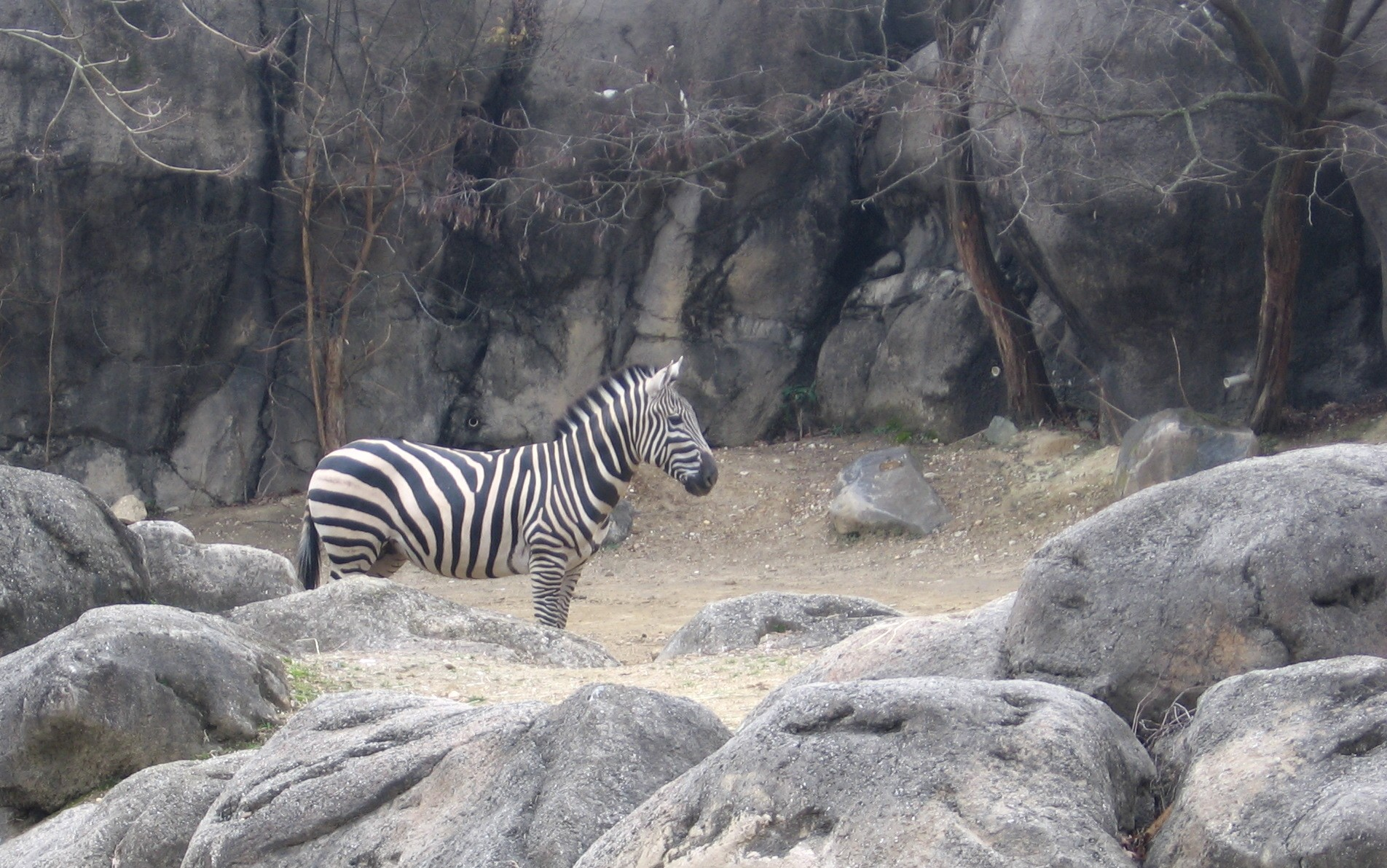
The Maryland Zoo is located in the center of the park.

The Druid Hill Farmers' Market is located at the Howard P. Rawlings Conservatory in Druid Hill Park. When open, it offers free programming each week, including concerts, children's activities, yoga classes, plant workshops, art workshops, hay rides, hula hoops, 4-H Workshops, and more. The market runs weekly from June through September.

The park also is the venue for the annual Charm City Cyclocross bicycle race in mid-September, which is one of the major cyclocross bicycle races on the East Coast of the United States.

Since 2014, the annual Charm City Folk and Bluegrass Festival is held each April, next to the H.P. Rawlings Conservatory and Botanical Gardens.

=== Health ===
The park served as an attractive hill for winter sledding during the 1940s, particularly for boys attending the nearby Talmudical Academy of Baltimore.

In 2007, the city of Baltimore spent $50,000 on exercise equipment for the park. There are three workout stations around the park reservoir. These have rowing machines, ellipticals, and leg presses, all free for public use. Baltimore planned to install more outdoor exercise equipment for other parks in the city by 2010.

=== Monuments ===
There are many different monuments in Druid Hill Park. The Wallace Monument, standing at 30 feet (9.1 m) tall, honors fourteenth-century Scottish hero and rebellion chieftain William Wallace. The Wagner Monument, dedicated to the German composer, stands on the lawn near the Mansion House ("Druid Hill" mansion). The monument in honor of Christopher Columbus lies within view of the main South Driveway, and looks out upon the reservoir. The statue of George Washington (removed from the old Carroll Hall building from the mid-19th century at the southwest corner of Calvert and Baltimore streets in downtown) is placed at an intersection near the rotunda driveway.

=== Housing ===
Druid Hill Park is not home to any private residences, according to the official neighborhood boundaries by the city government of Baltimore. However, the Mansion House, located in The Maryland Zoo, which was built in 1801, served as the estate for Colonel Nicholas Rogers and his family until it was converted into a public pavilion in 1863. The only privately owned properties that are somewhat within the general park outline are at the northeastern corner of the park. This small enclave is the Brick Hill historic district dating to 1877, made of small masonry as well as stone duplexes, where those who worked at the Meadow Mill of the Woodberry Manufacturing Company lived. However, this is considered to be a part of the Woodberry neighborhood. Many homes face the park in the neighborhoods of Hampden, Liberty Square, Park Circle, Parkview Woodbrook, Reservoir Hill, and Woodberry. The Auchentoroly Terrace, which faces the neighborhood in the Parkview Woodbrook neighborhood, is a historic district of nine blocks built between 1876 and the 1920s in the Victorian style.

== Gallery ==
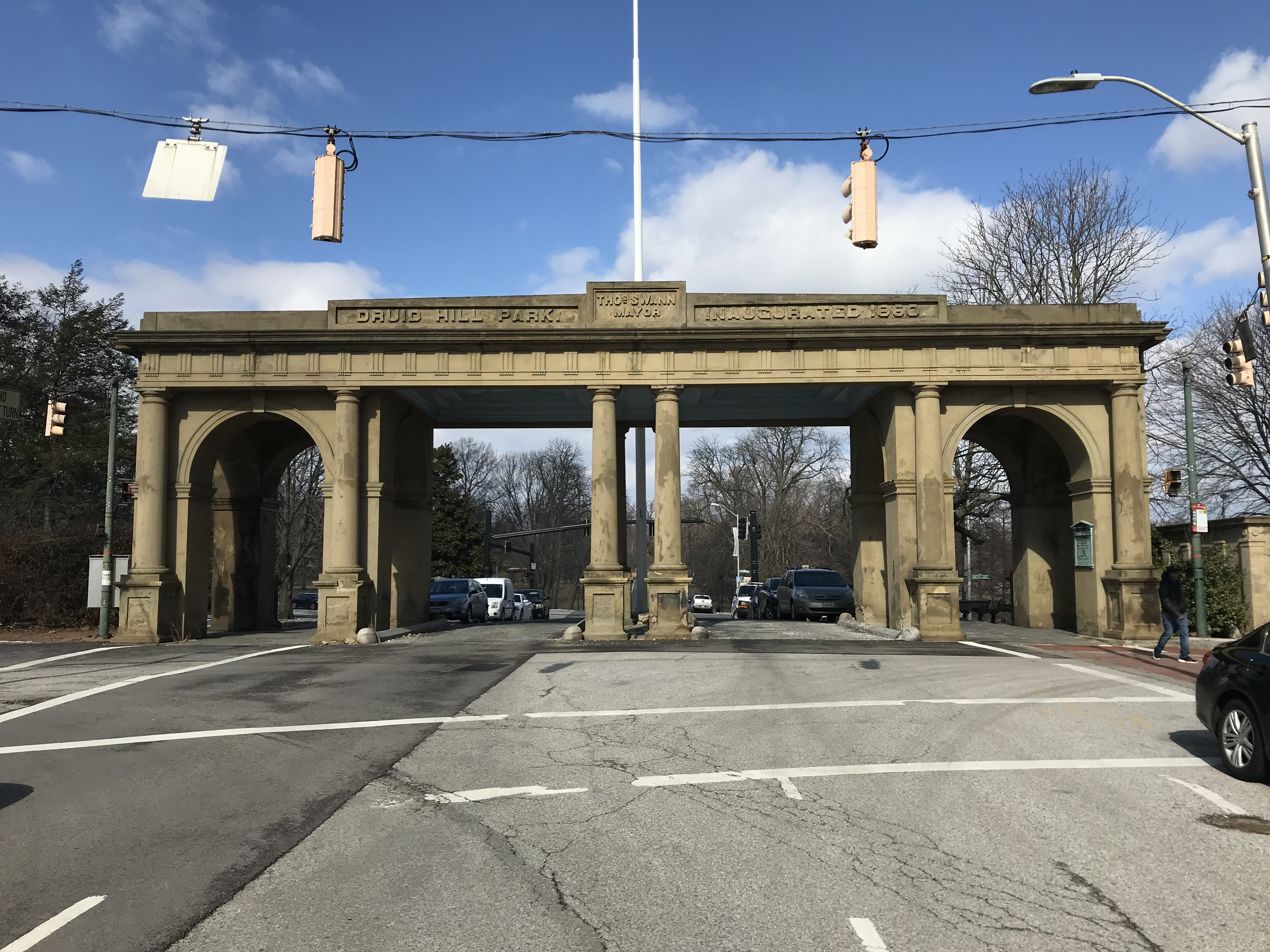
Original entrance from Madison Avenue

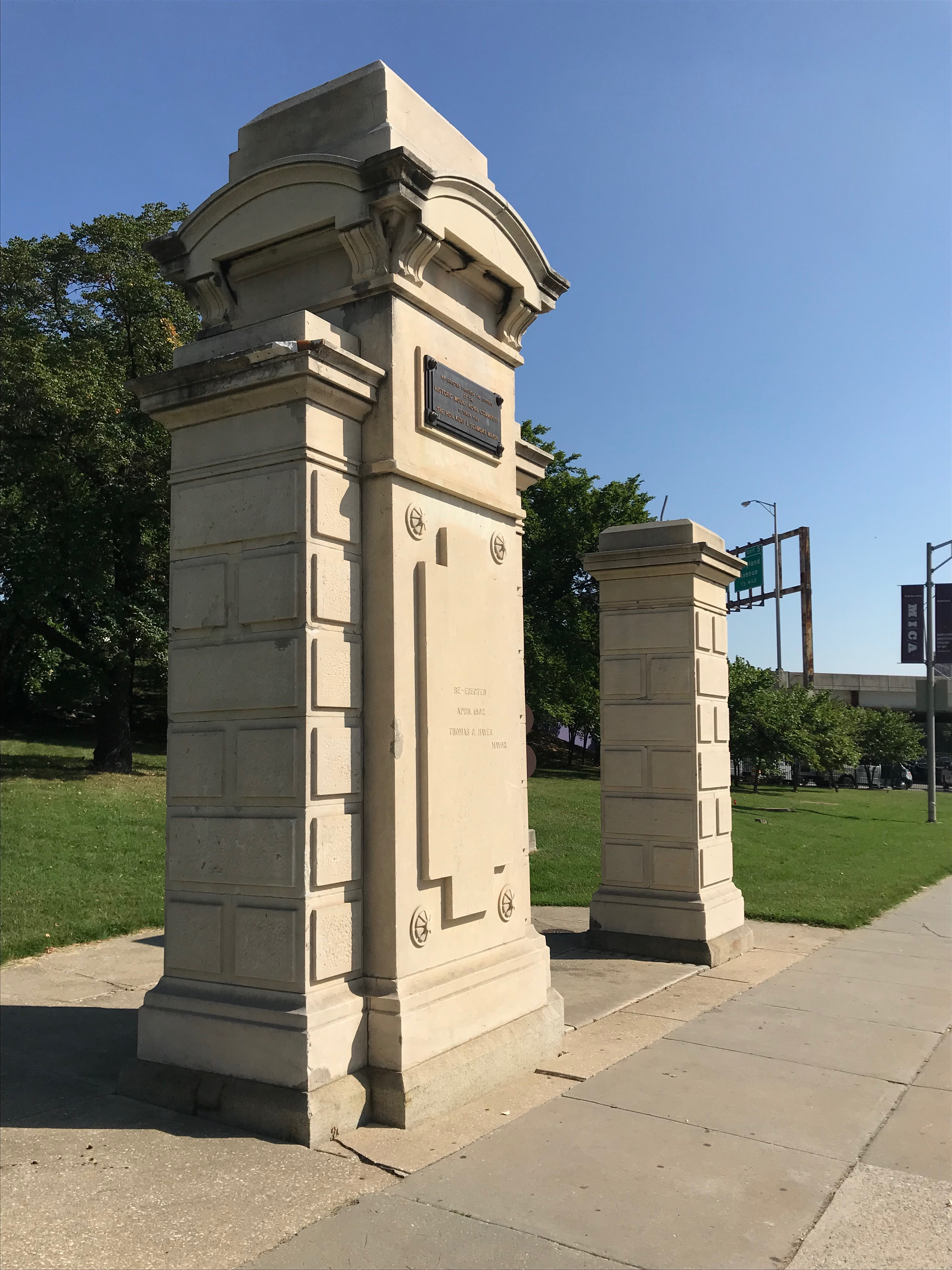
Former entrance from North Avenue

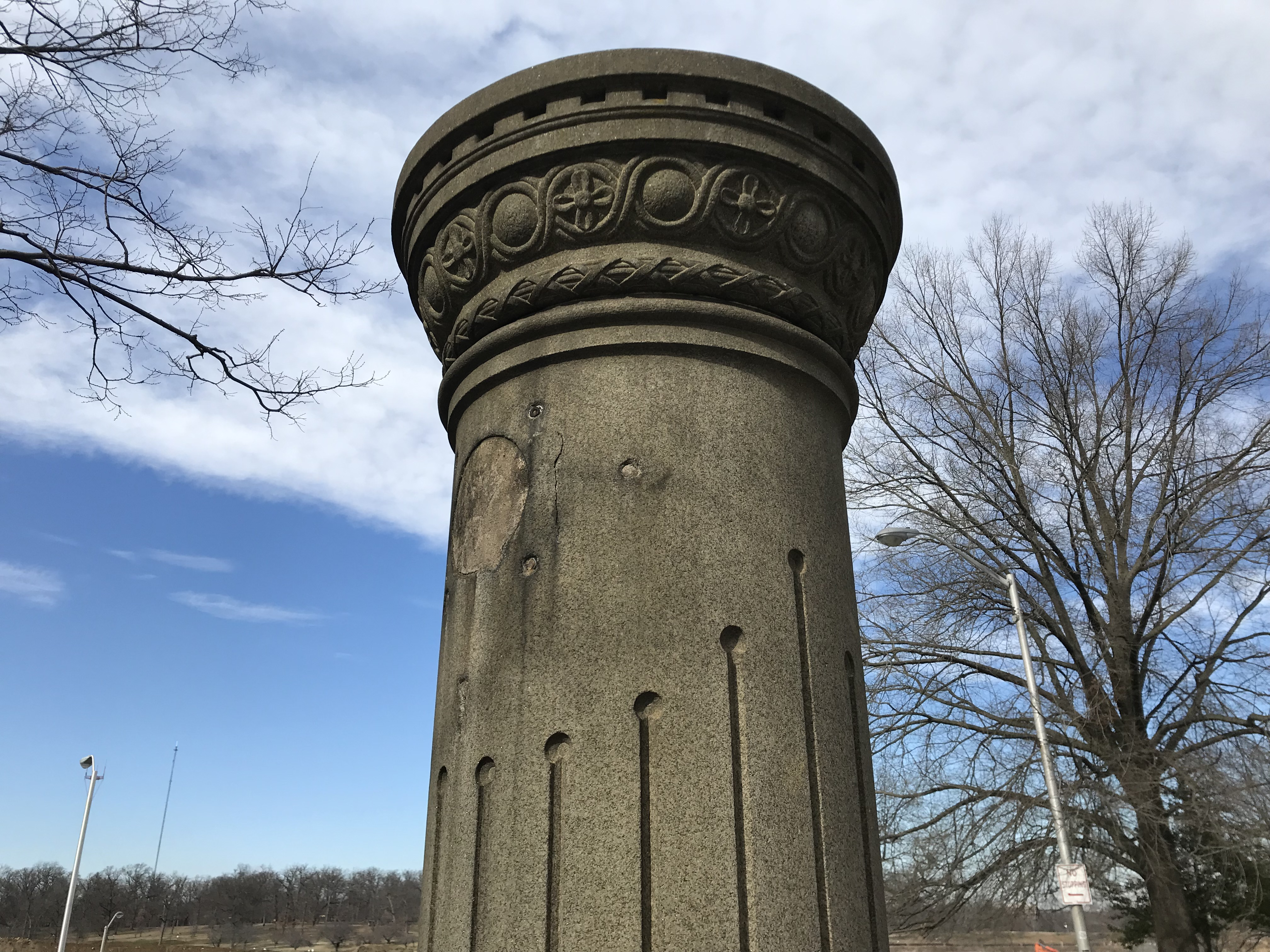
Eutaw Place gateway

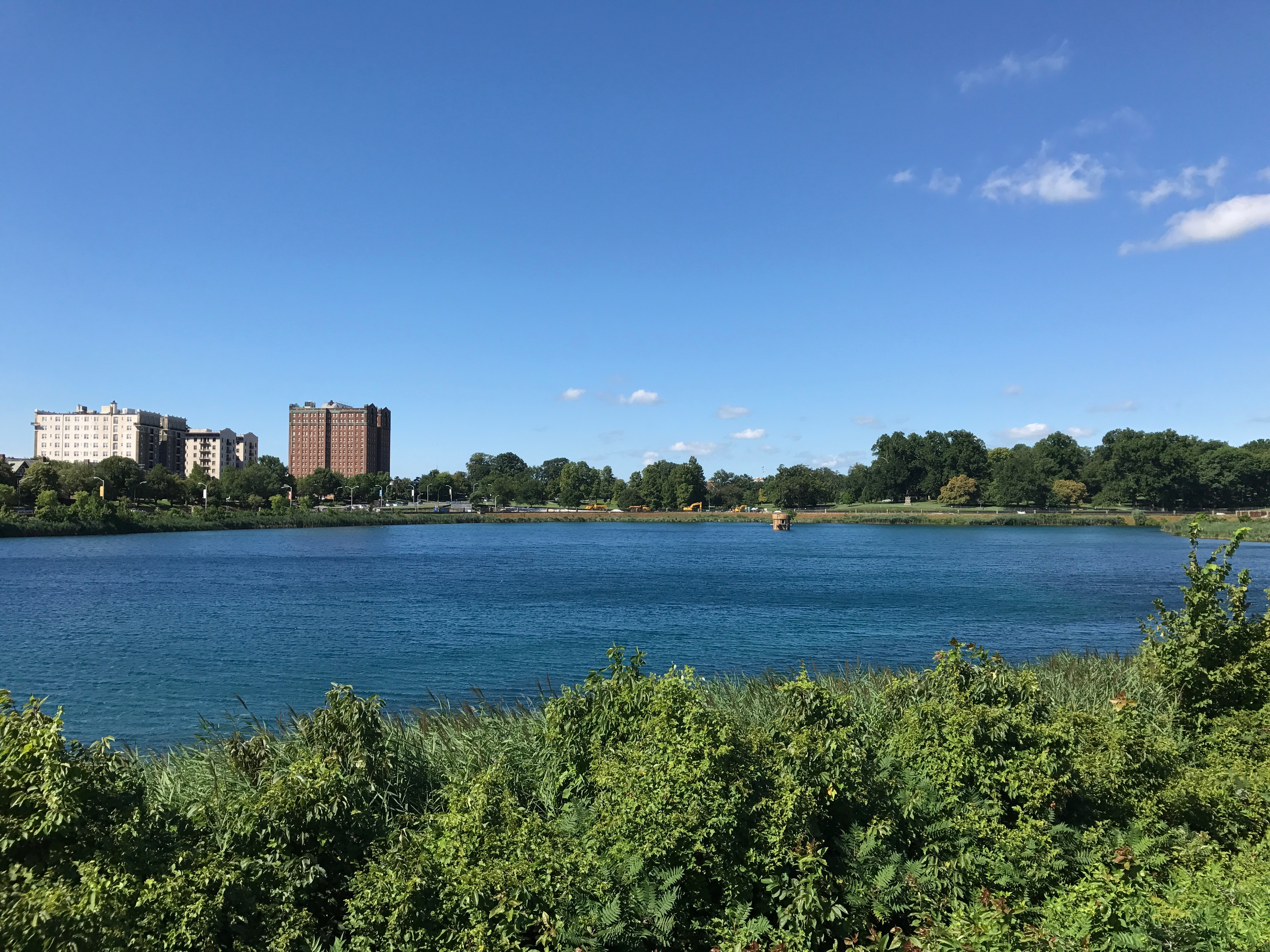
Druid Lake

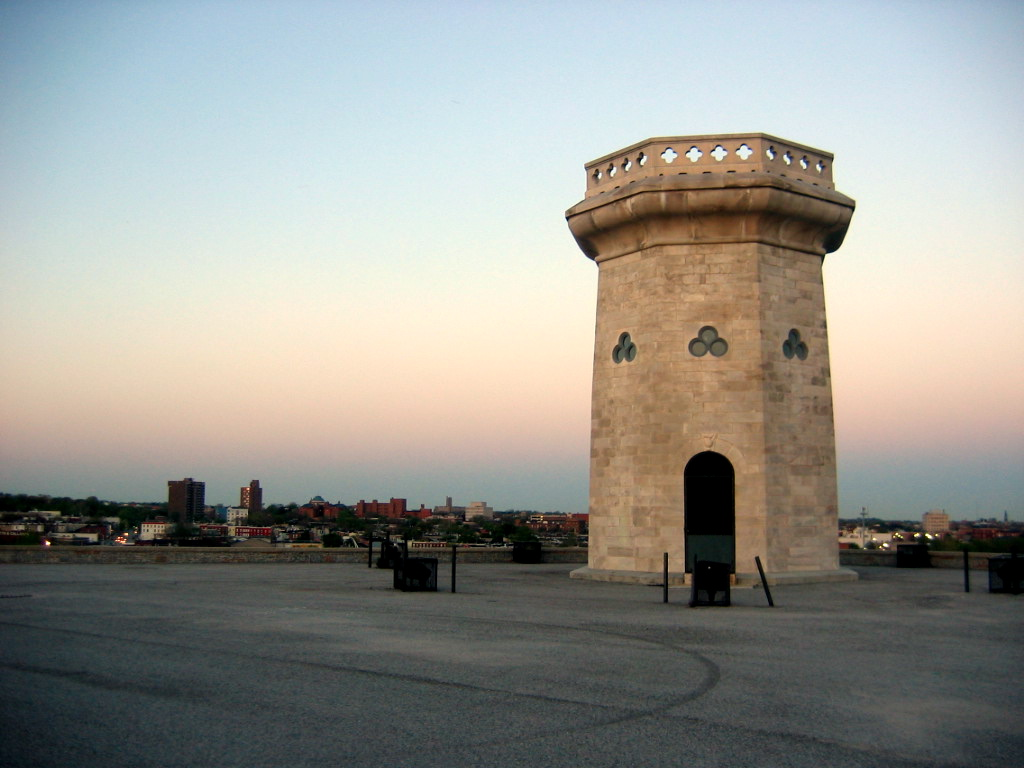
Moorish Tower at the southeast corner

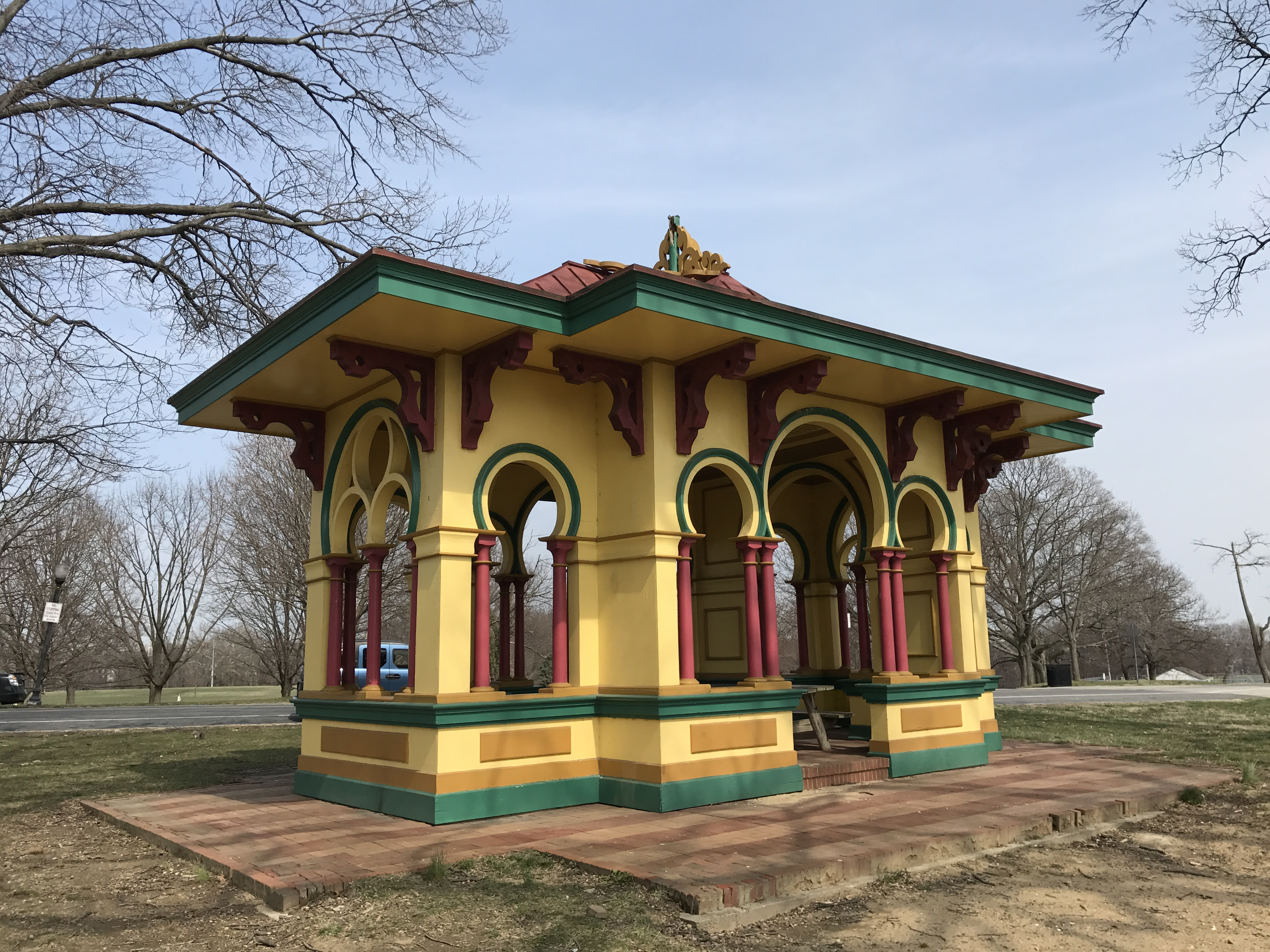
Latrobe Pavilion

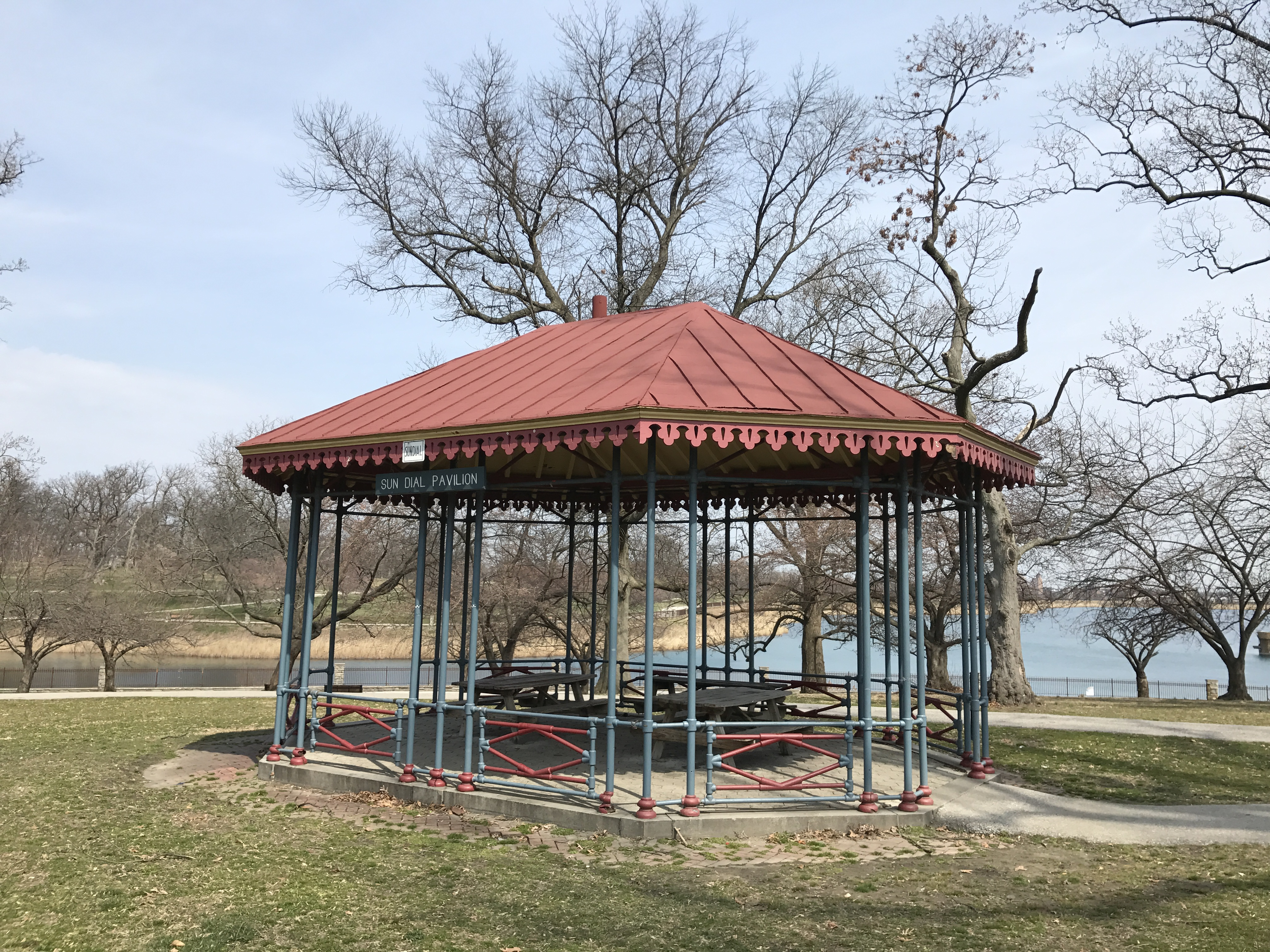
Sundial Pavilion

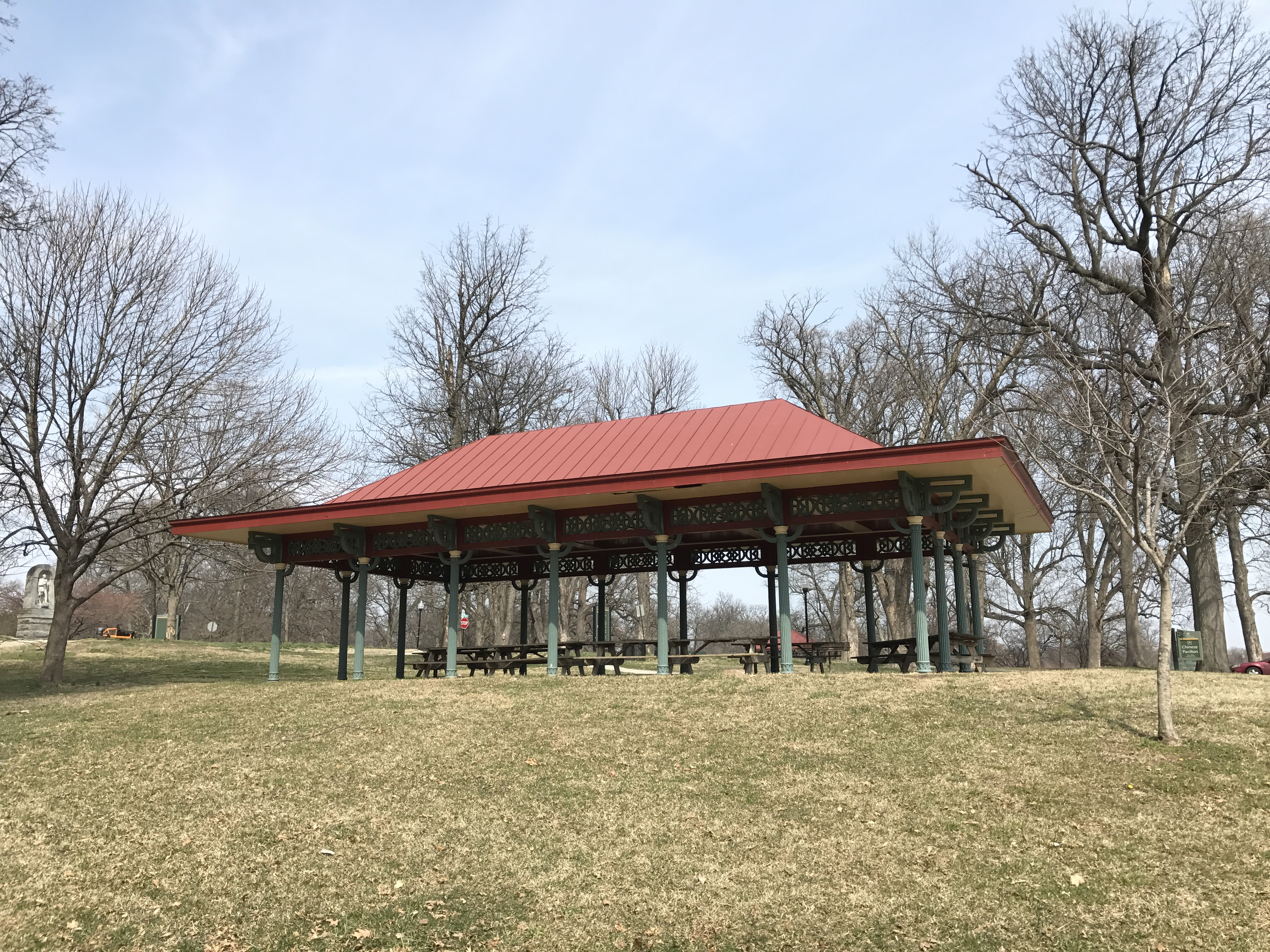
Chinese Pavilion

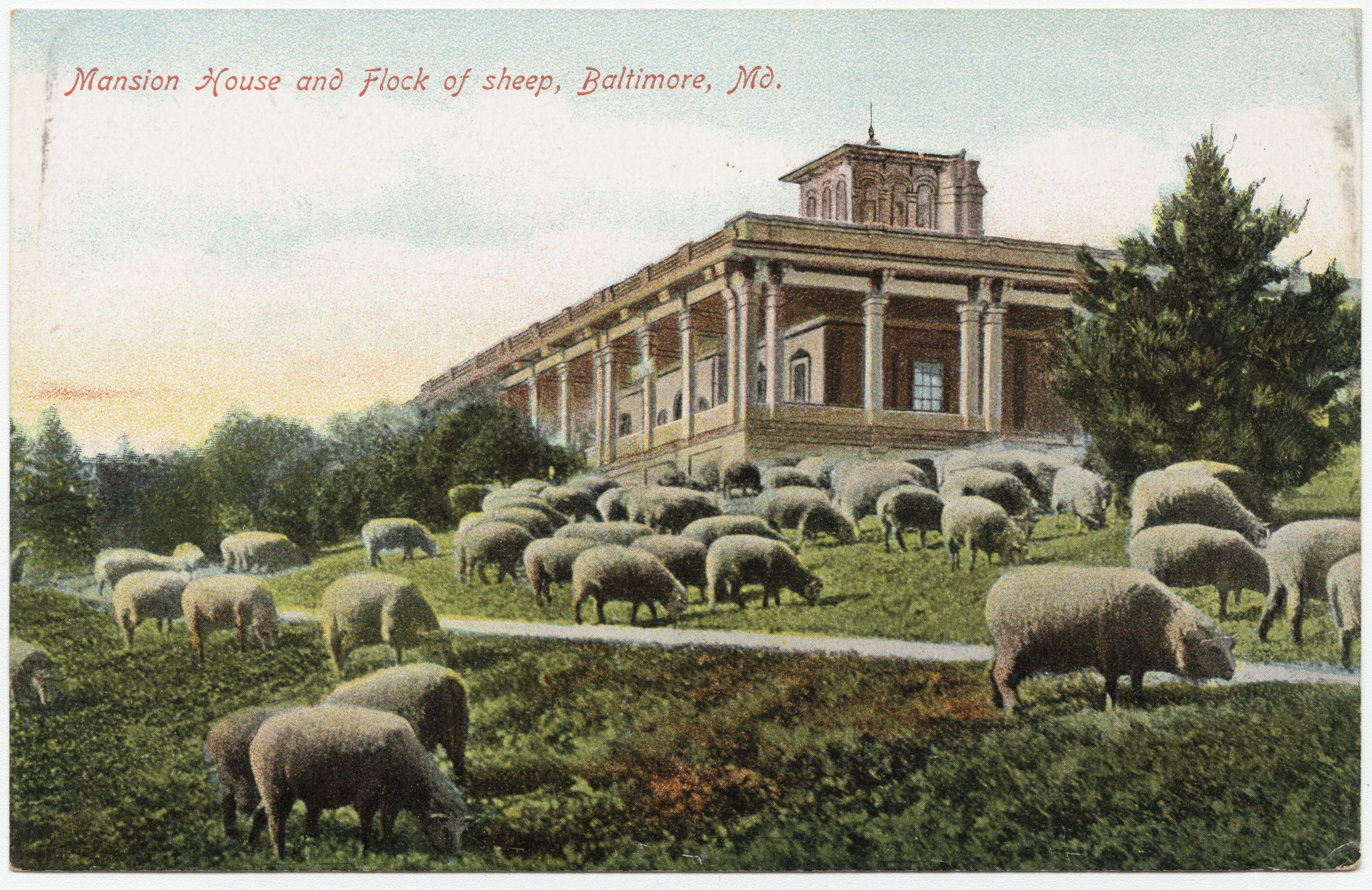
Mansion House circa 1910

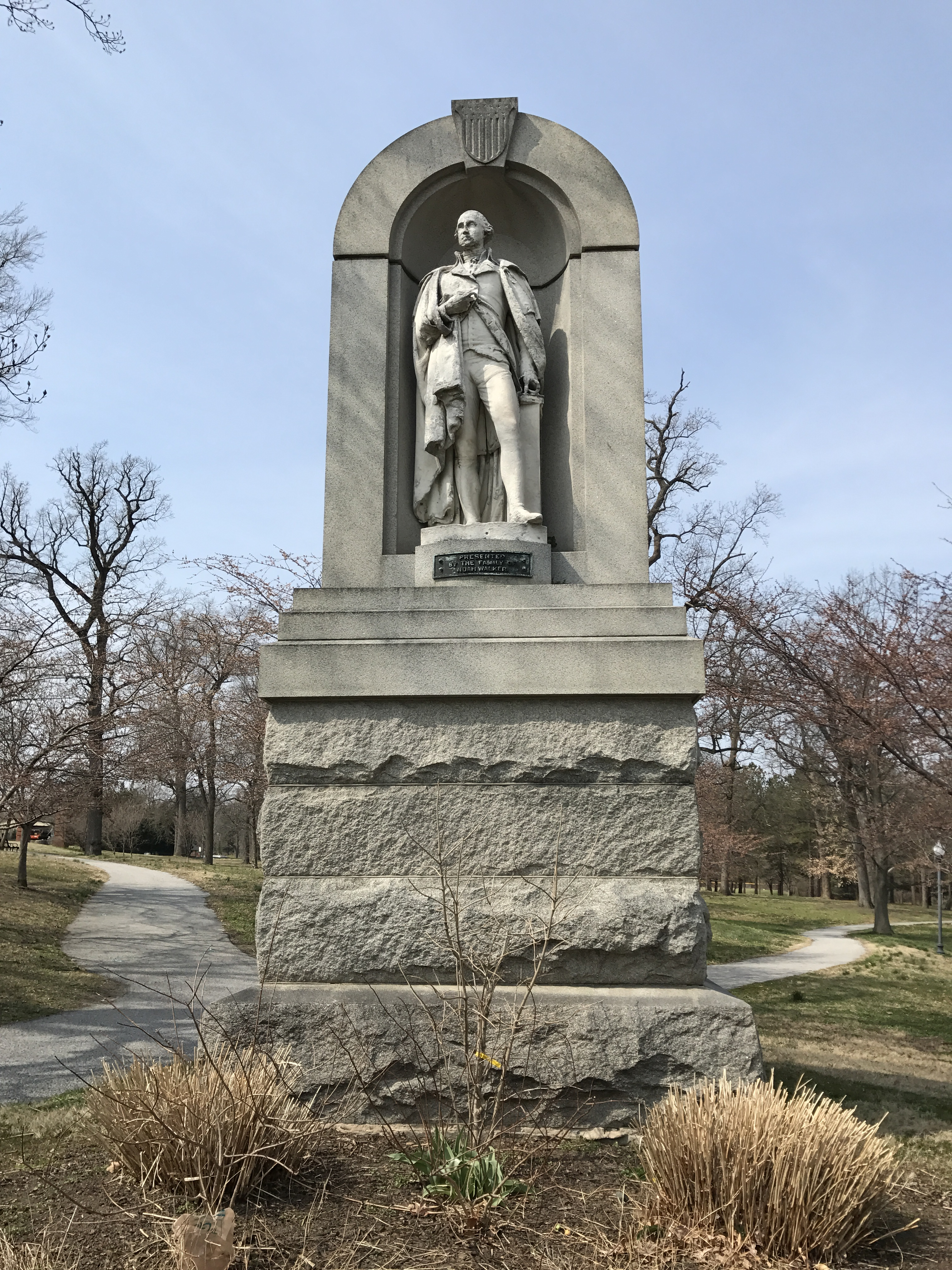
George Washington Monument

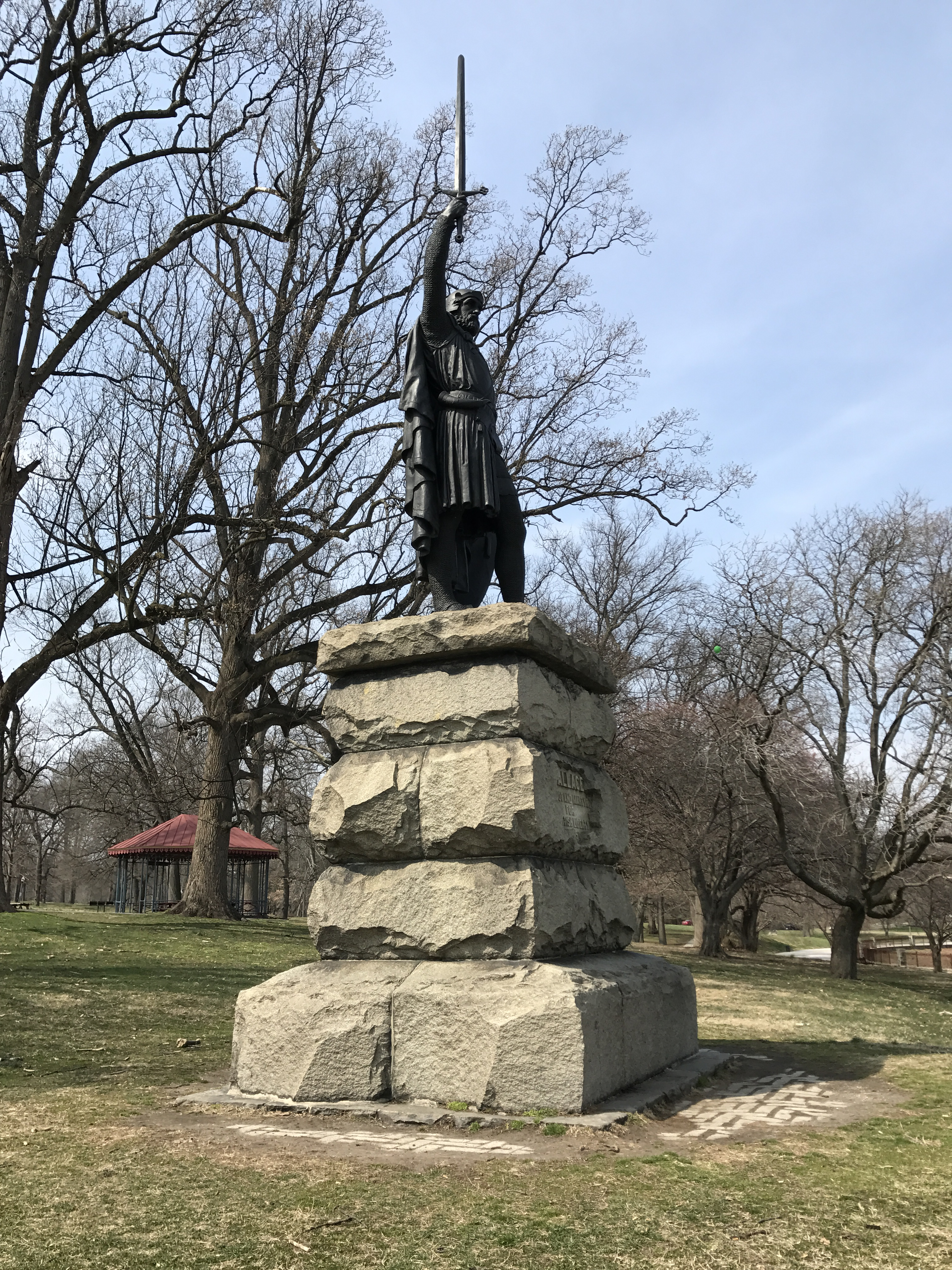
William Wallace Monument

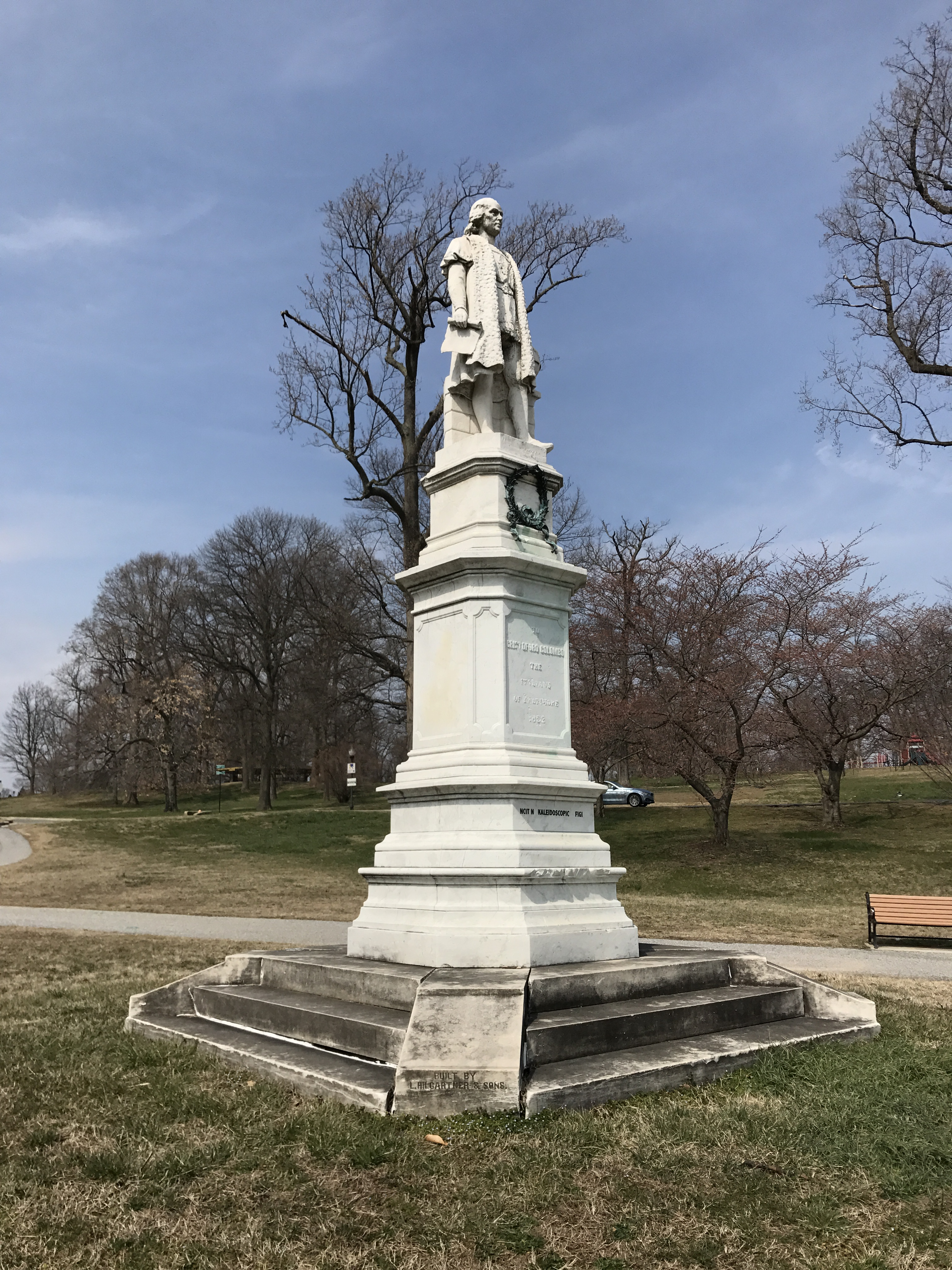
Christopher Columbus Monument

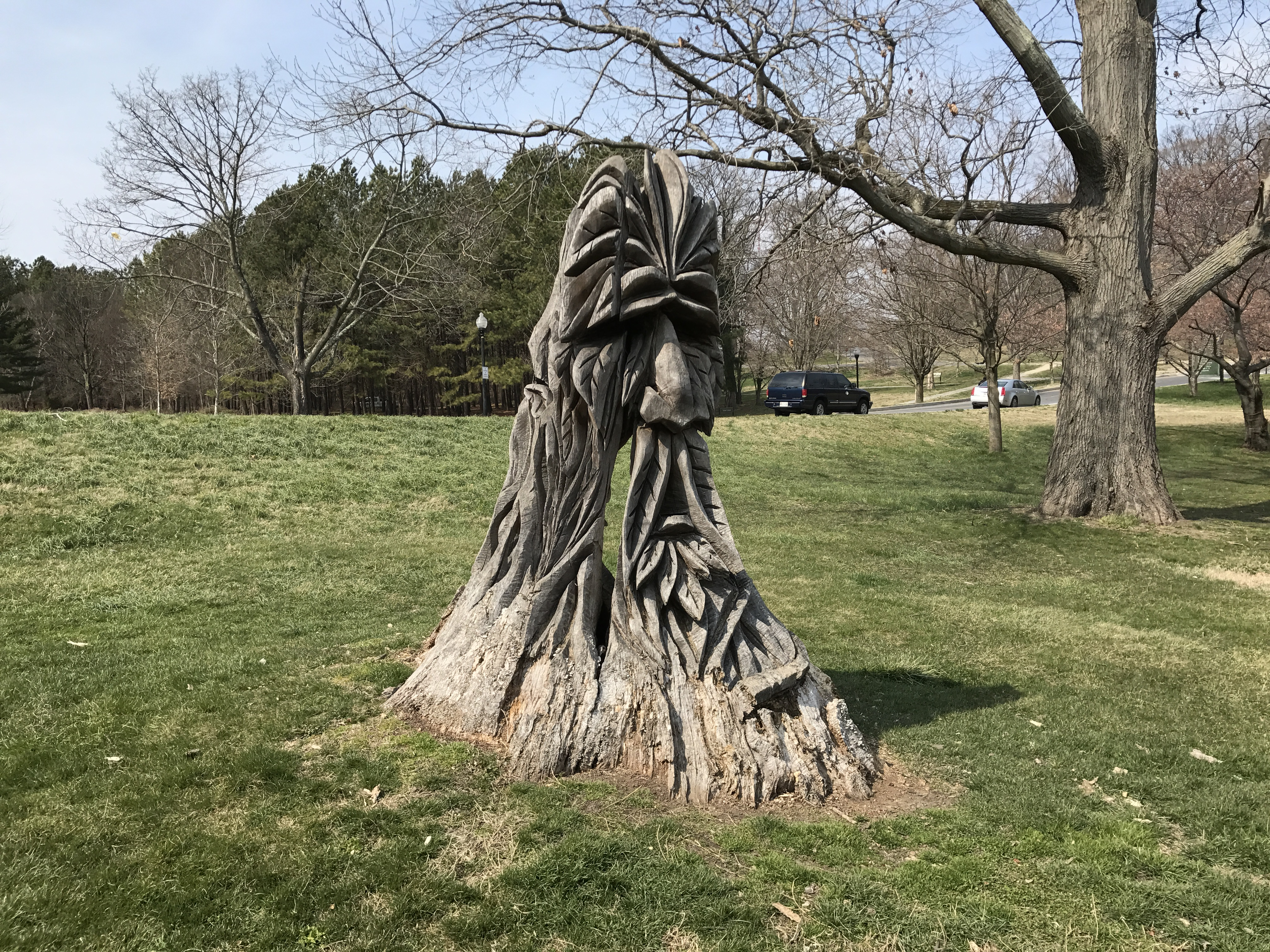
Druid Sculpture

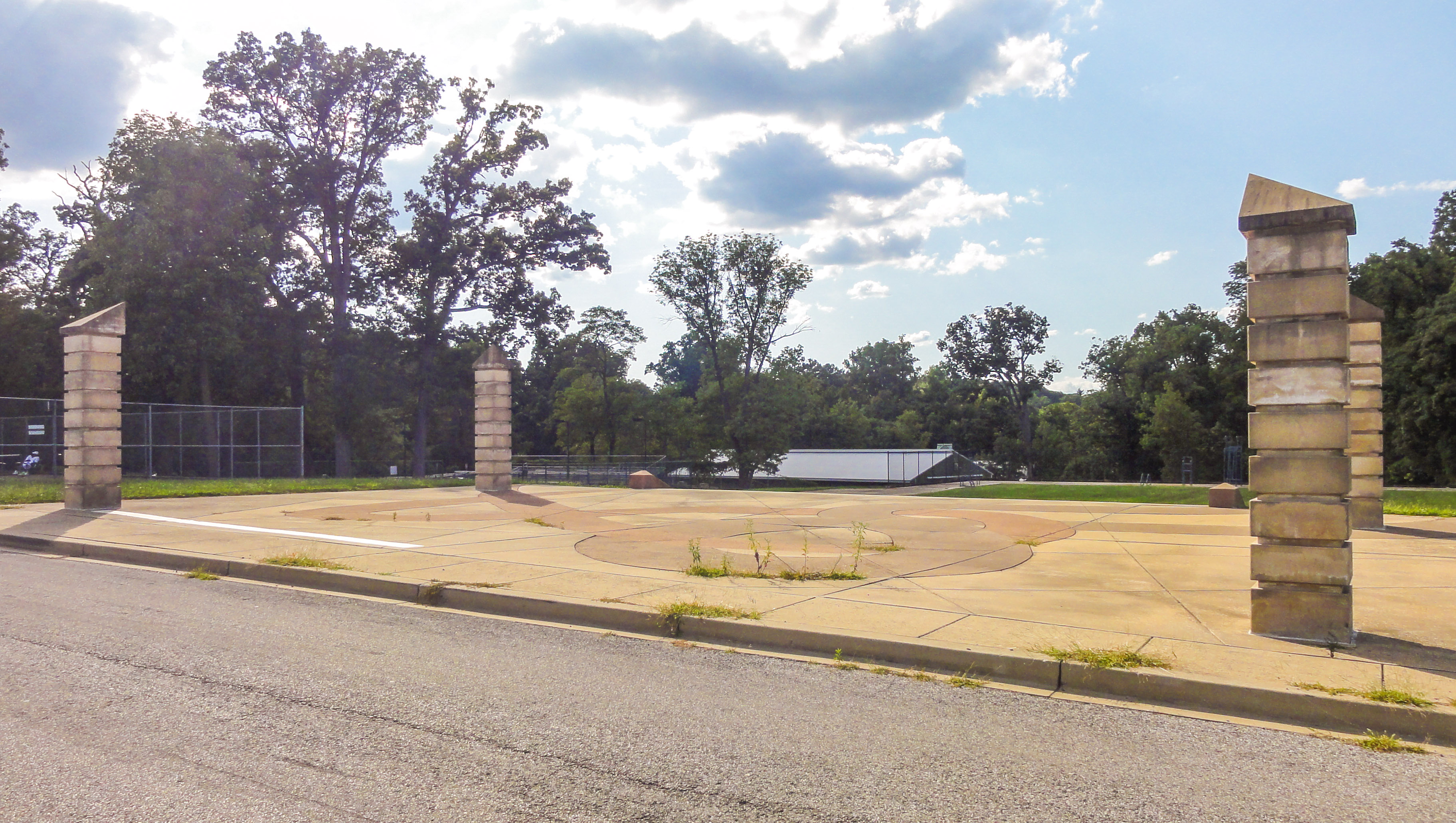
Memorial Pool

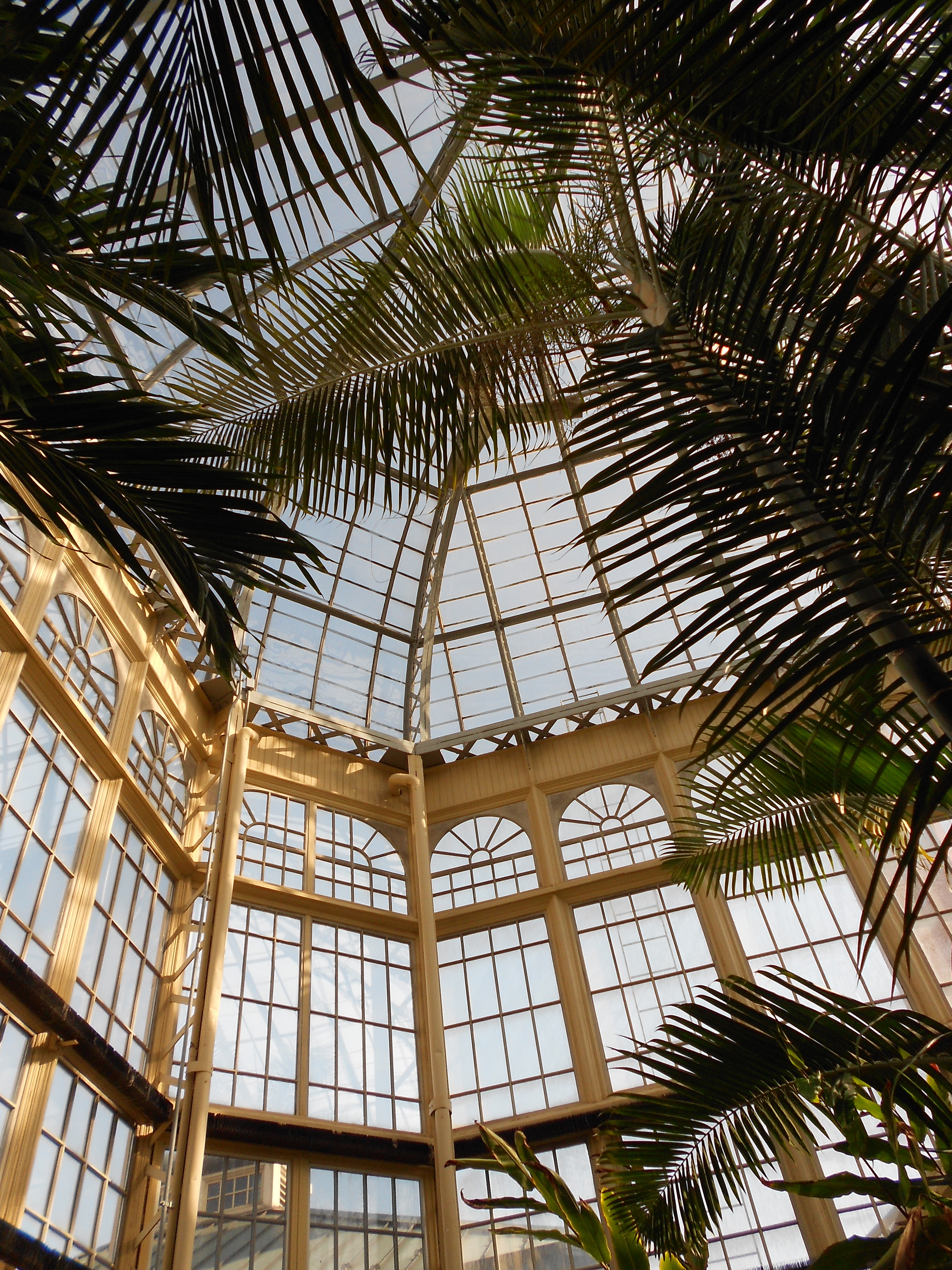
Rawlings Conservatory

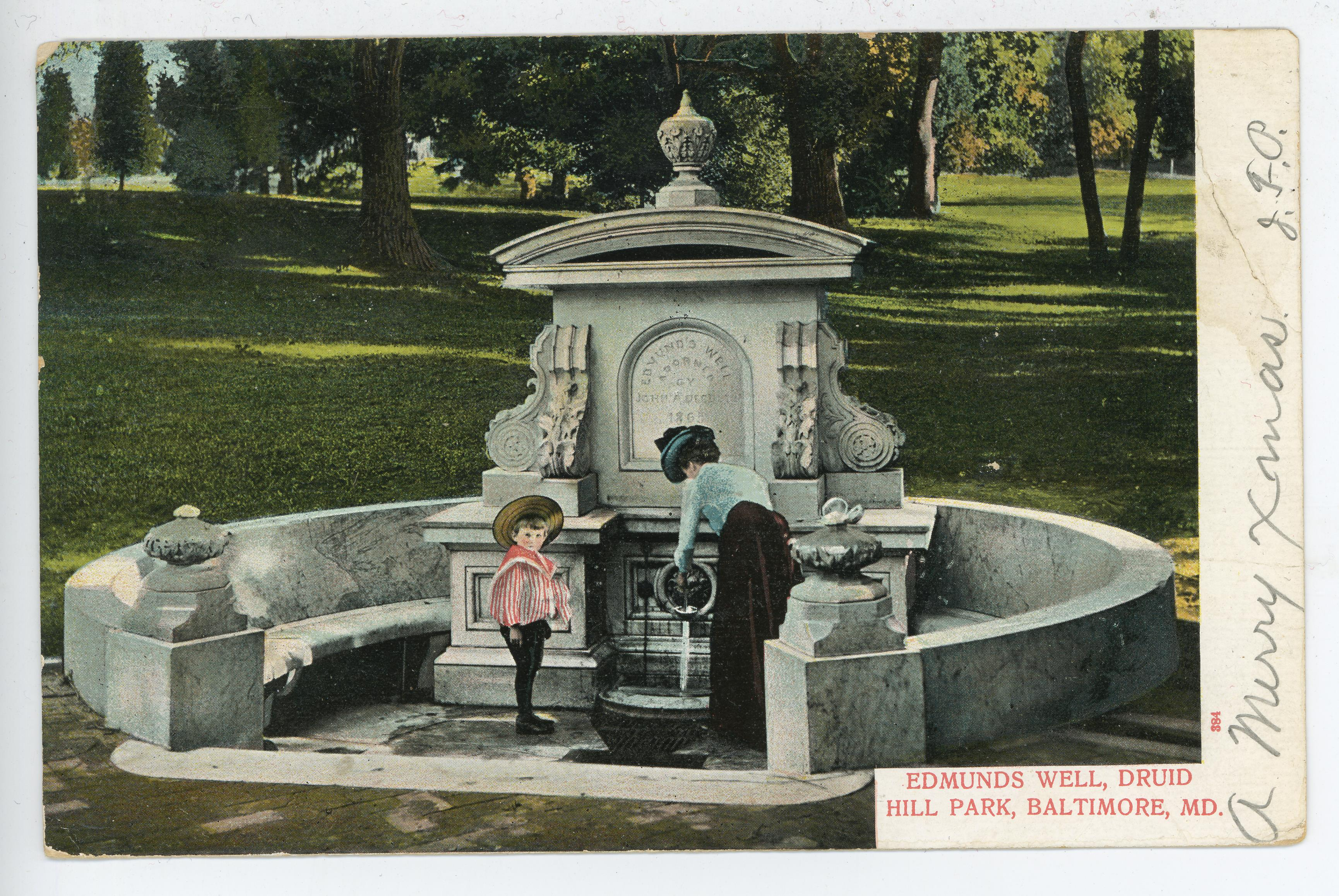
Edmunds Well

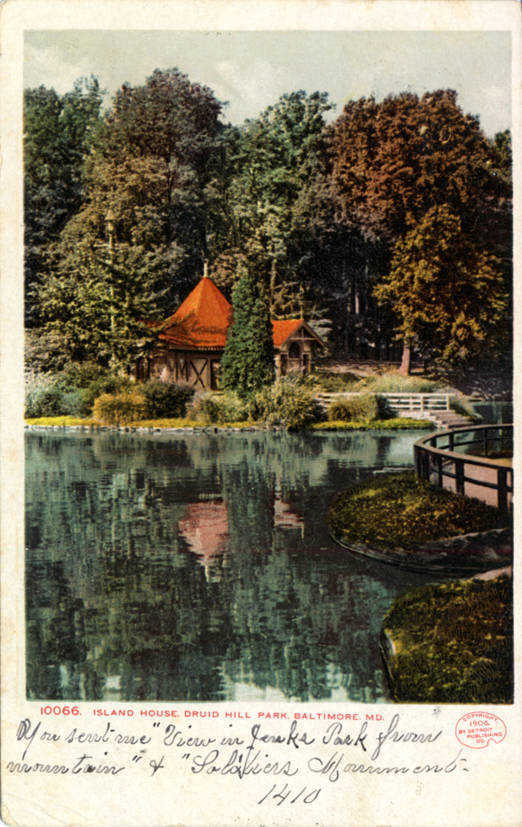
Island House in Boat Lake

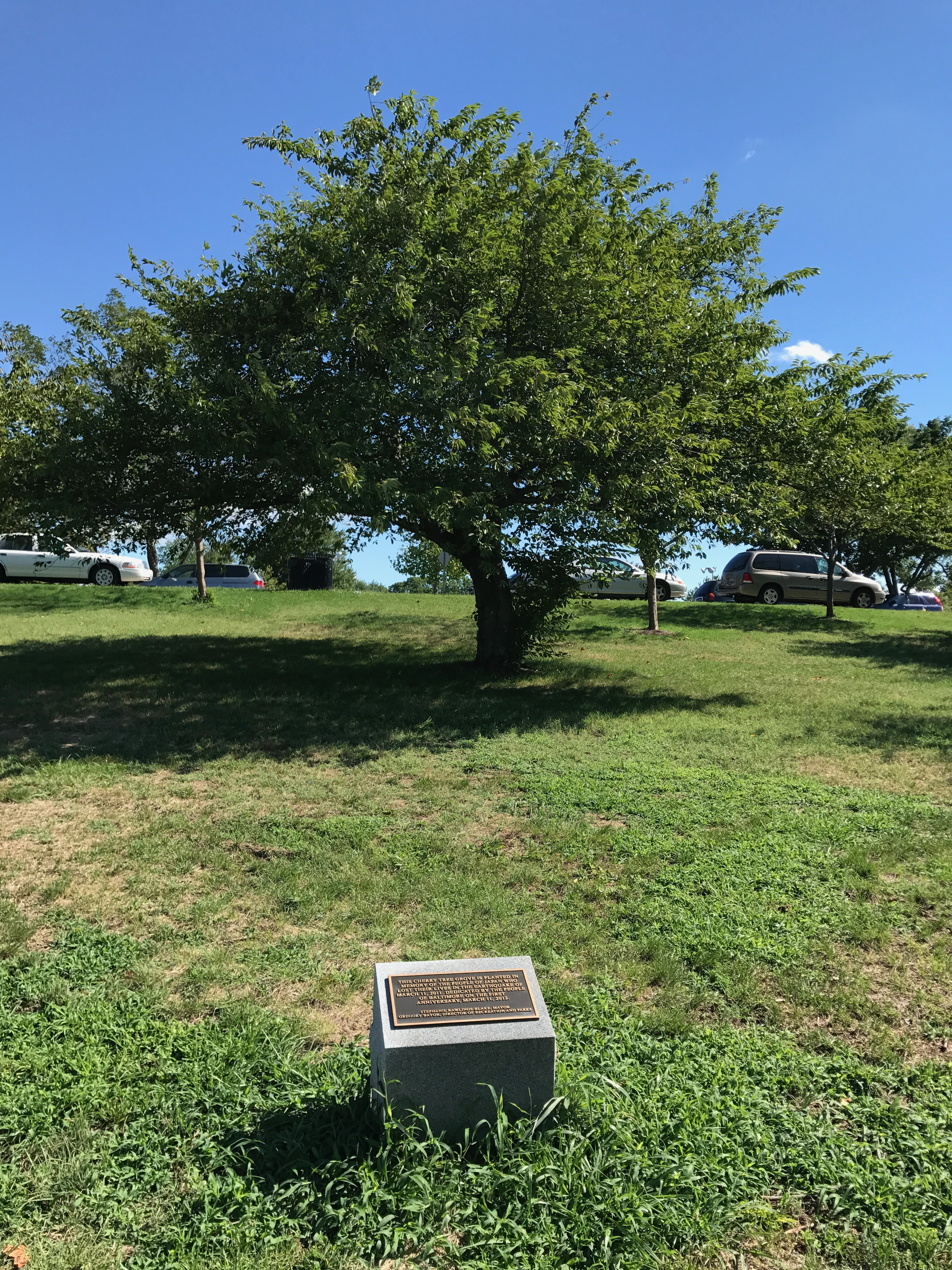
Cherry Tree Grove

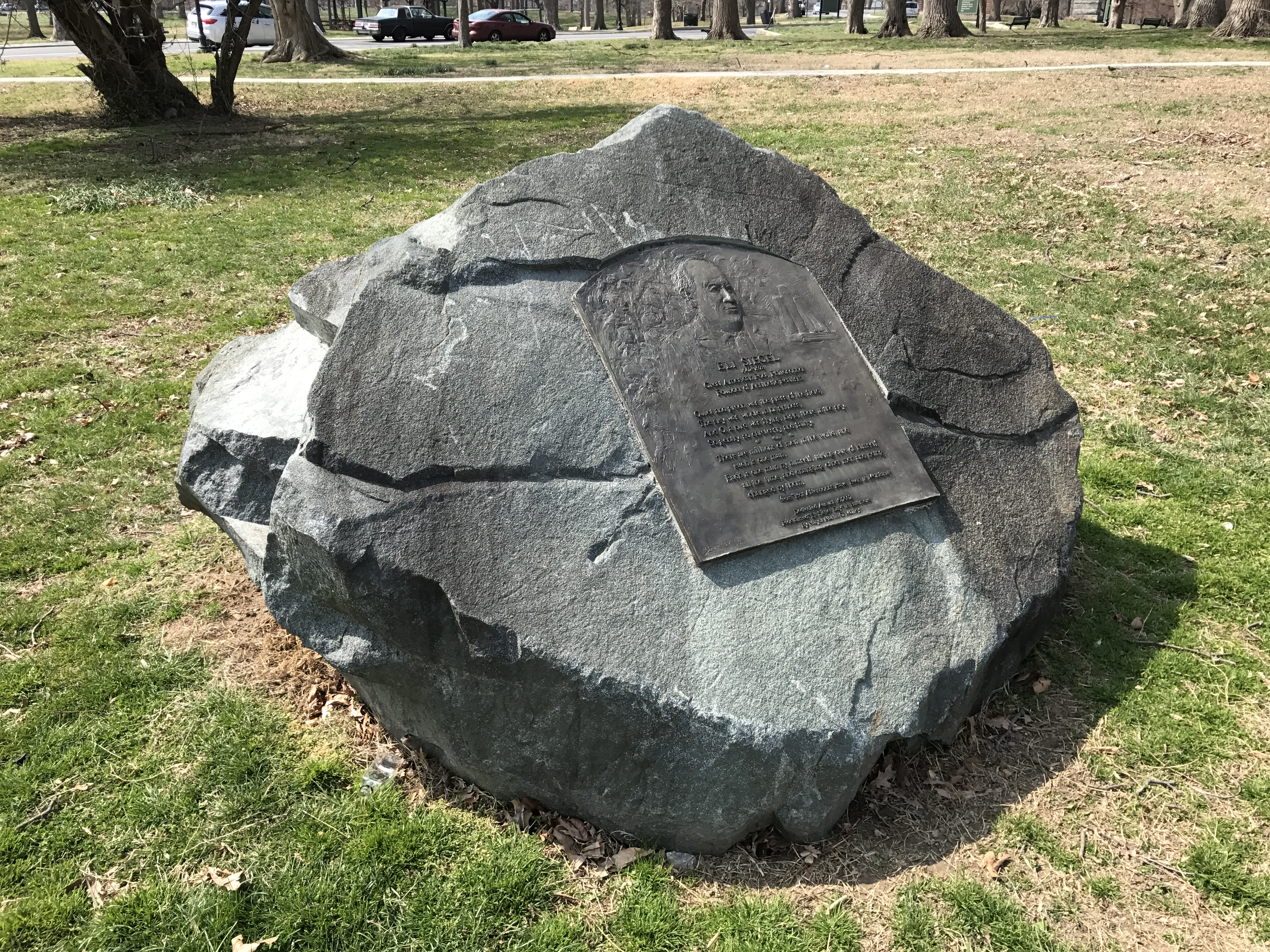
Eli Siegel Stone

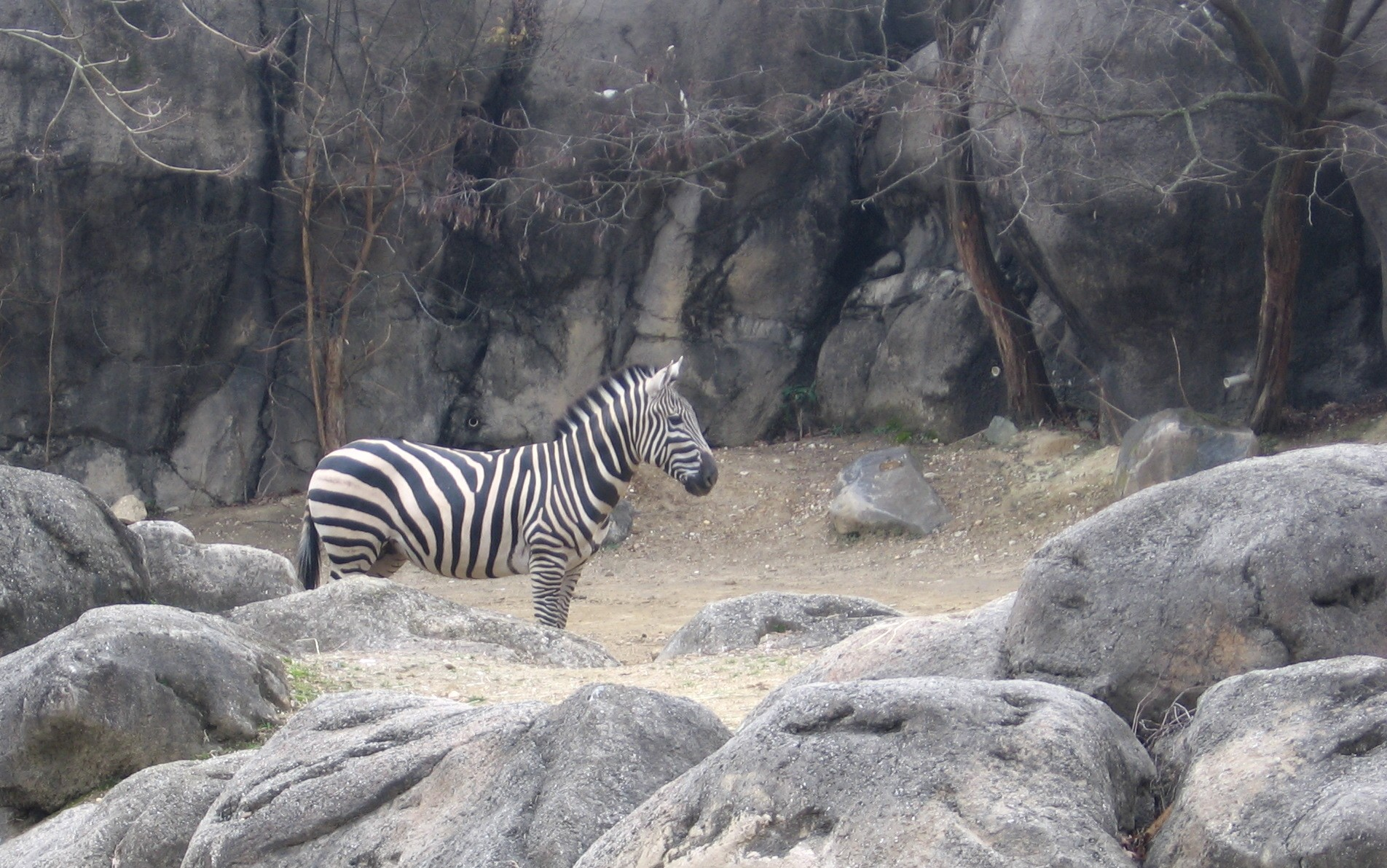
Maryland Zoo

== Features ==
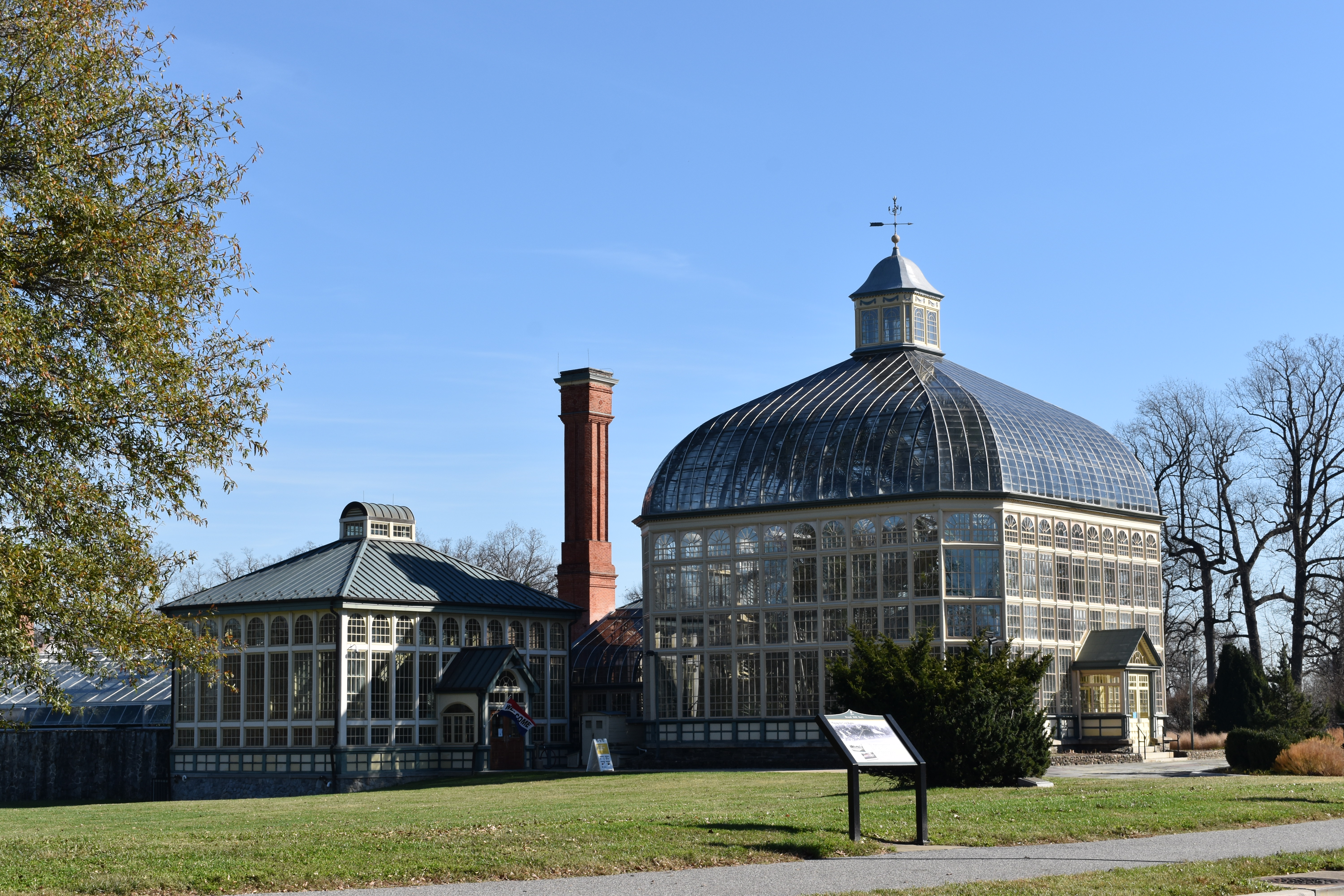
The H.P. Rawlings Conservatory

Today, the park is home to a number of attractions. These include:

- The Maryland Zoo, formerly the Baltimore City Zoo, home to over 2,000 animals and is considered the third oldest zoo in the United States opening in 1876
- The Howard Peters Rawlings Conservatory and Botanic Gardens of Baltimore, with its historic Palm House and Orchid Room, built in 1888
- The Baltimore Model Safety City (where school children learn how to be safe pedestrians by walking in a miniaturized model of downtown Baltimore)
- An 18-hole disc golf course with 15 additional holes in the woods and another 18-hole wooded course under construction
- Almost a dozen historic shelters and exotic pavilions
- Recreational facilities including swimming pools, tennis courts, and ballfields
- Jones Falls Trail, a hiking and bicycling trail, leaves the Jones Falls at the Woodberry Light Rail Station to enter the north end of Druid Hill Park. It then runs along the west side of the park, before it circles Druid Hill Lake and exits at the southeast corner, where to continues to follow the Jones Falls south.
- Local residents often refer to the park as "Dru Hill" Park, a "Baltimorese" (local dialect) corruption of its given name, itself the inspiration for the name of the popular local R&B group Dru Hill.

== Additional buildings ==
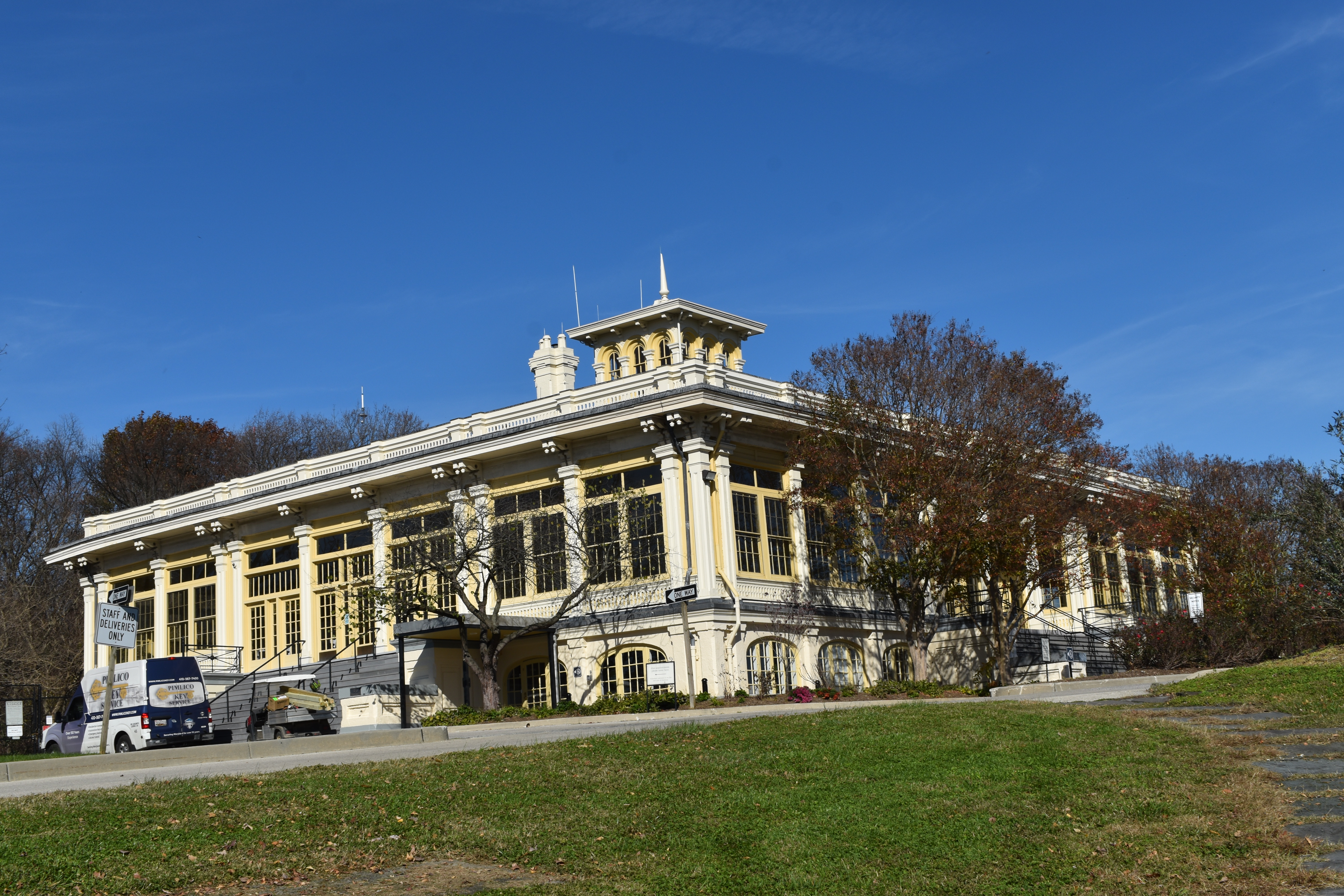
The Mansion House now home to the administration of the Maryland Zoo.

Druid Hill Park is home to 22 structures protected under the National Register of Historic Places. Some of the main structures are highlighted below:

- Engineer's House (1894/1955): home to the Baltimore City Department of Recreation and Parks at 2600 Madison Avenue near the arched entrance
- Forestry Building/Wagon Shed (ca 1903–1914) home to the Baltimore City Forestry Division and TreeBaltimore's nursery at 3100 Shop Road
- High Service Reservoir Pumping Station/Aquarium/Reptile House (ca. 1914-1921/1938/1948): originally built as a pumping station, but is mostly remembered for housing the Baltimore Zoo's reptile collection from 1948 until 2004, and was previously Baltimore's first aquarium from 1938 until 1948. The building at Greenspring Avenue and Beechwood Drive is now vacant.
- Mansion House (1801): the only remaining building from the original Rogers estate (now part of the Maryland Zoo)
- Maryland House (1876): built for the 1876 Exposition in Philadelphia and reassembled in the park (now part of the Maryland Zoo)
- Superintendent's House (1872): "Stone House", now home to the Parks and People Foundation at 2100 Liberty Heights Avenue
- Western Pumping Station/Bath and Field House (1873/1924): now home to the Baltimore City Department of Recreation and Parks Headquarters at 3100 East Drive
