= Howard Peters Rawlings Conservatory and Botanic Gardens of Baltimore =

Historic conservatory/greenhouse and botanical garden in Baltimore, Maryland

Coordinates: 39°19′7″N 76°38′46″W

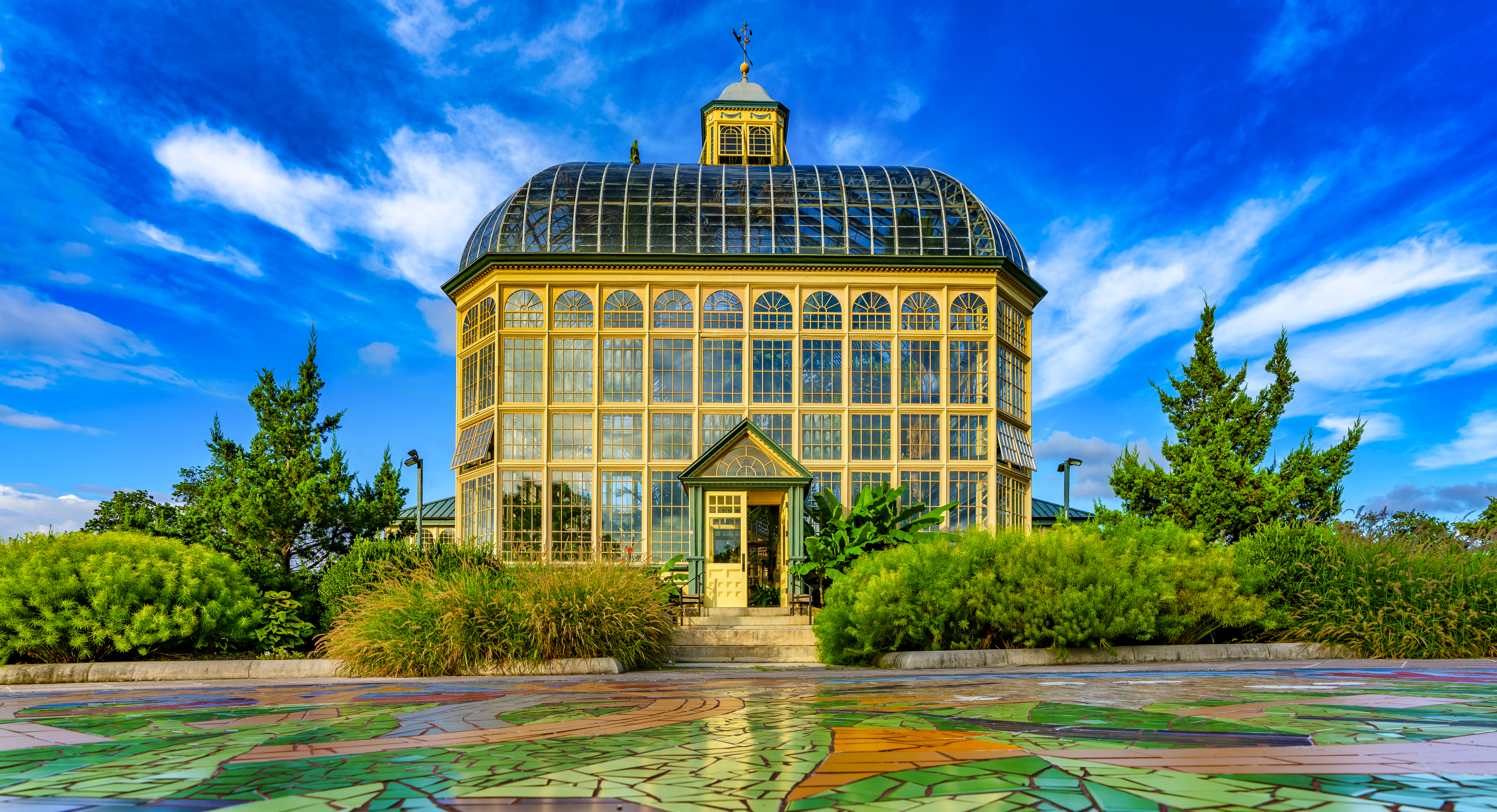
- Interactive map of Howard Peters Rawlings Conservatory and Botanic Gardens of Baltimore
- Website: Official website

The Howard Peters Rawlings Conservatory and Botanic Gardens of Baltimore, often known as the Baltimore City Conservatory, is a historic conservatory / greenhouse and botanical garden located in Druid Hill Park at 3100 Swann Drive, in the northwest area of Baltimore, Maryland.

It was designed by George A. Frederick (1842–1924), who was the architect of the Baltimore City Hall (1867–1875), and semi-official municipal architect of Baltimore in the late 19th century.

The new conservatory opened to the public on August 26, 1888, 28 years after the city's largest park itself. A major renovation in the early 2000s added two new side wing production houses. It now contains five distinct areas: the 1888 Palm House, the Orchid Room, Mediterranean House, Tropical House, and Desert House. The surrounding 1.5 acres (0.61 ha) of grounds within Druid Hill Park, feature 35 flowerbeds.

The Rawlings Conservatory is on the National Register of Historic Places (kept by the National Park Service of the U.S. Department of the Interior), the Maryland Inventory of Historic Properties (maintained by the Maryland Historic Trust), and is a Baltimore City Landmark.

It is the second oldest surviving public glass conservatory in the United States, after the Conservatory of Flowers.

== Gallery ==
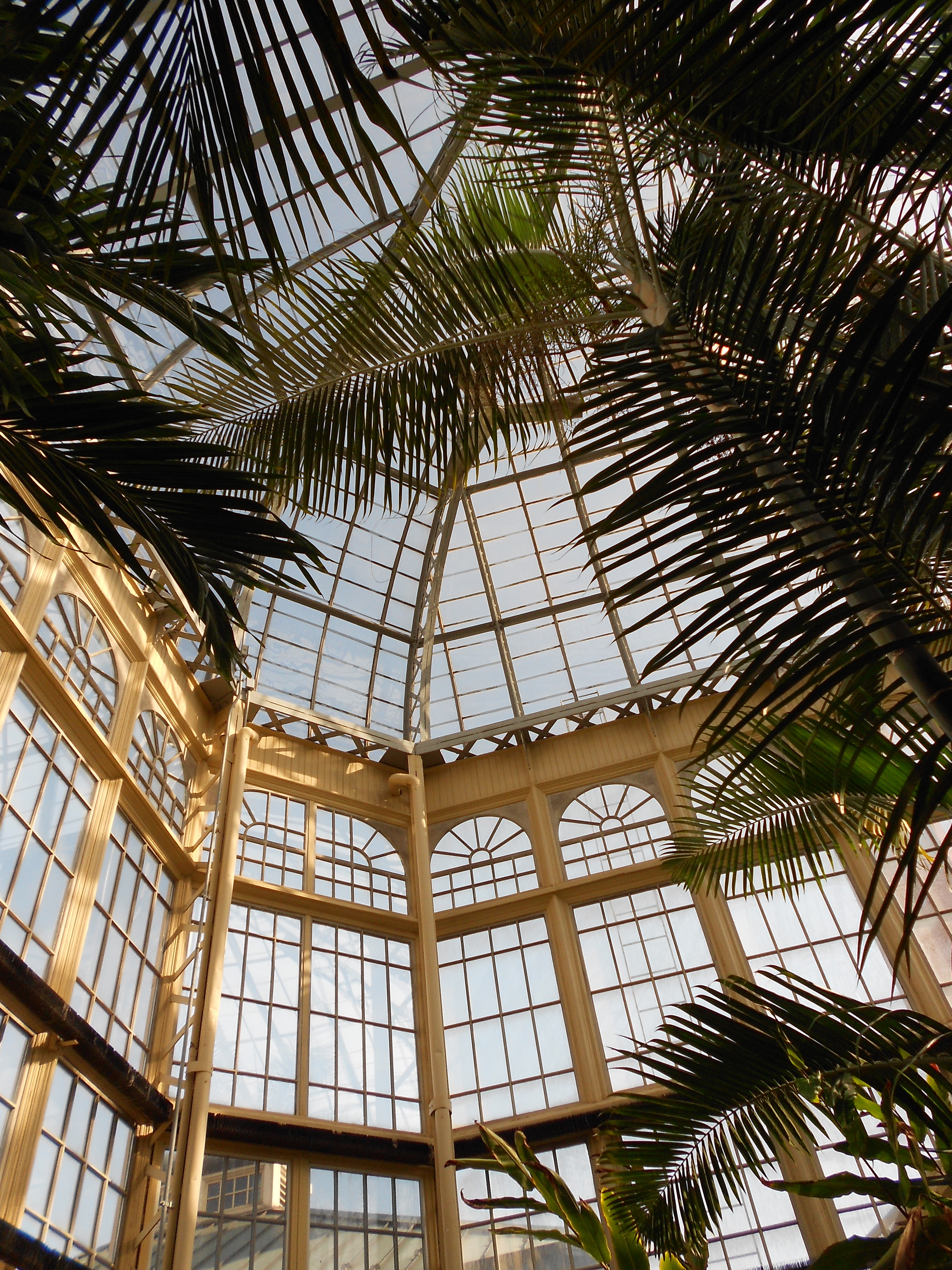

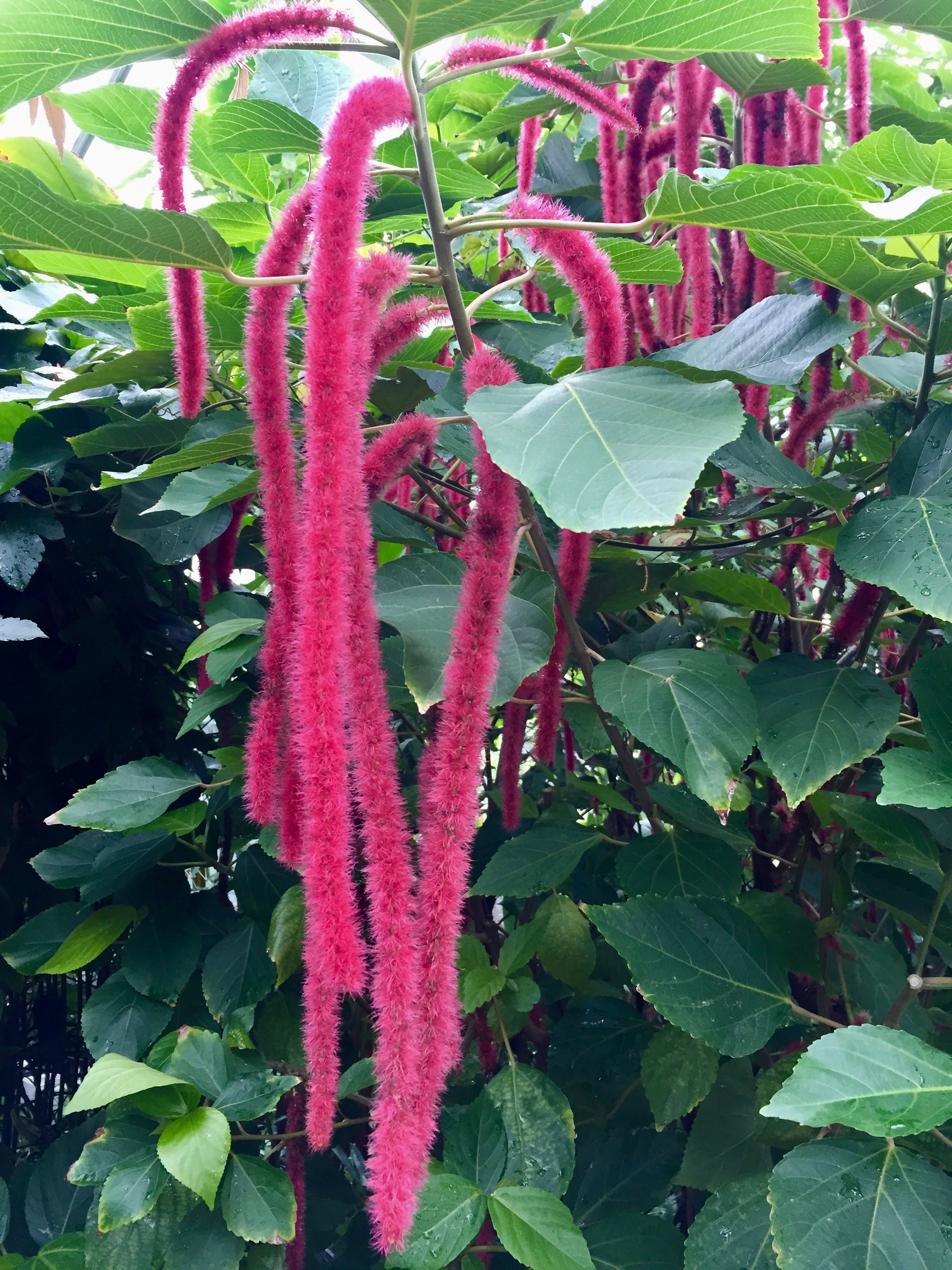

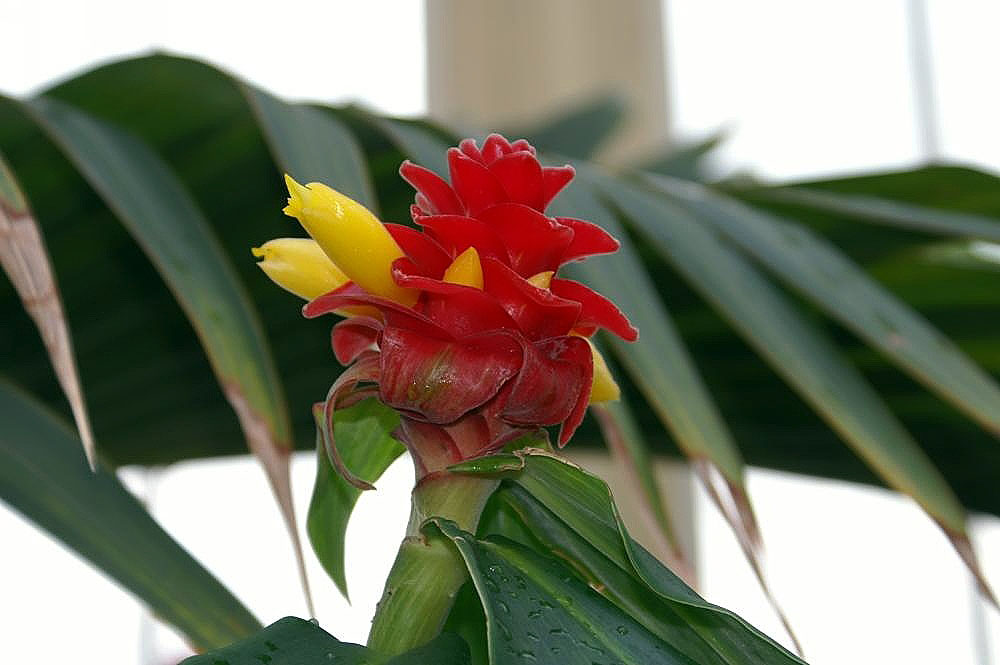

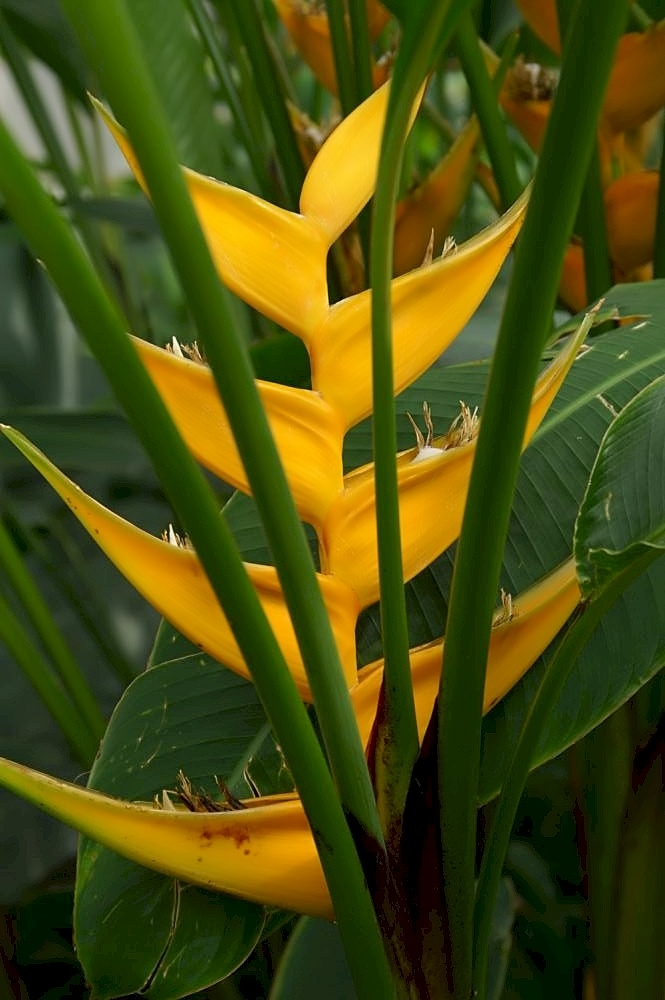

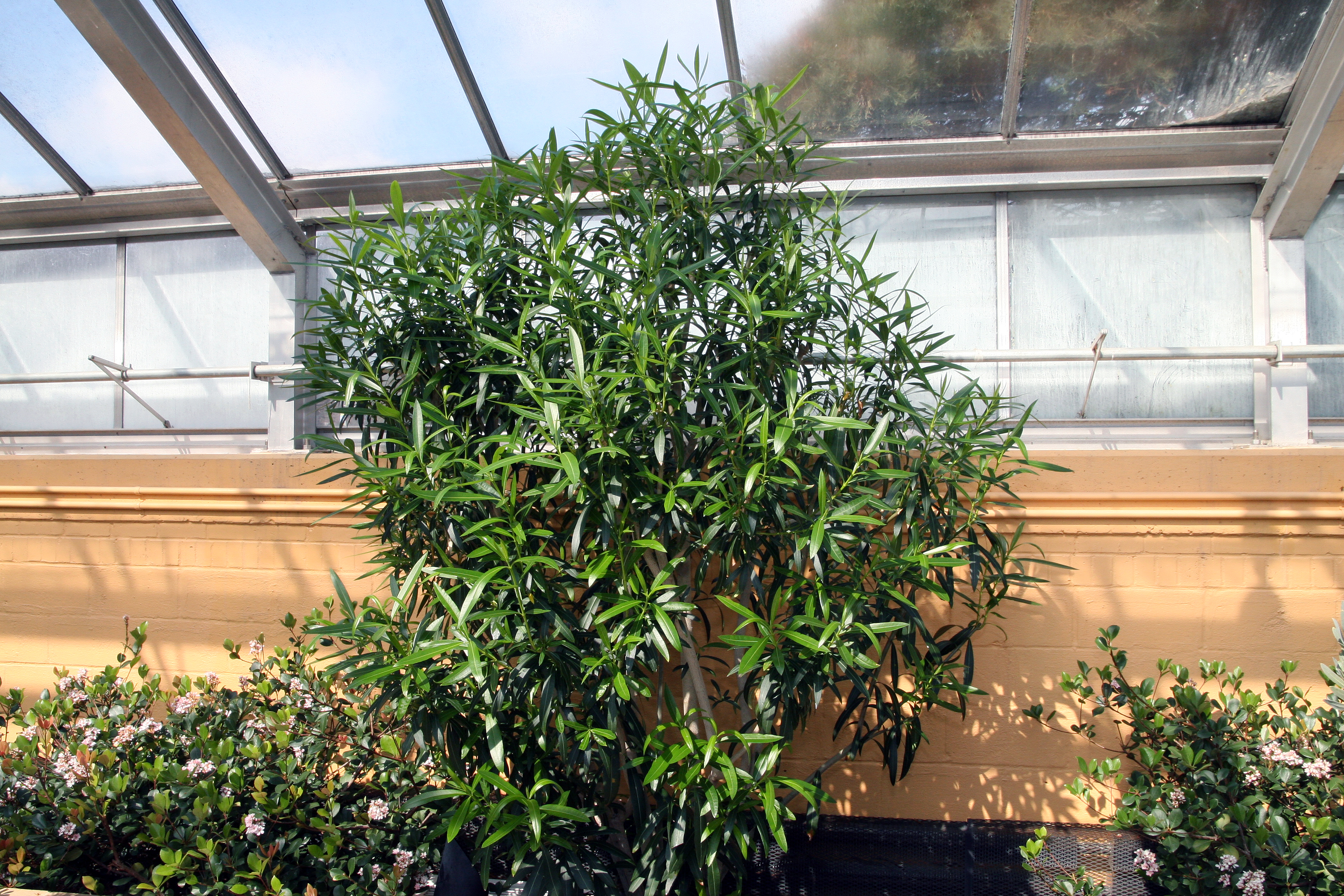

== See also ==
- List of botanical gardens in the United States
- List of prominent conservatories
