= George A. Frederick =

German-American architect

- Born: December 16, 1842; Maryland
- Died: August 17, 1924 (aged 81); Baltimore, Maryland
- Occupation: Architect
- Awards: Fellowship with the American Institute of Architects, 1877
- Buildings: Baltimore City Hall (1867-1875); Baltimore City College, (1873-1875), Maryland House of Correction (Jessup) (1878); Howard Peters Rawlings Conservatory and Botanic Gardens of Baltimore, (1888)
- Projects: Repairs to the Maryland State House; Architect to the Baltimore City Board of Parks Commissioners, 1863-1895; Maryland Exposition Building, built 1893 for World's Columbian Exposition (Chicago World's Fair)

George Aloysius Frederick (December 16, 1842 – August 17, 1924) was a German-American architect with a practice in Baltimore, Maryland, where his most prominent commission was the Baltimore City Hall (1867–1875), awarded him when he was only age 21. Later in the late 19th century, he served as the semi-official municipal architect.

On December 16, 1842, George Frederick was born in Baltimore, Maryland, the eldest child of John Martin, a clerk, and Anna, nee Hild. German immigrants from Bavaria who settled in the city. His parents called him Volishis Georg, but later he Americanized his name to George Aloysius. George had six siblings. He was educated at the Christian Brothers’ School (now Calvert Hall) until age 16.

He was accepted as an apprentice with a Baltimore architectural partnership with Lind & Murdoch, architects of the Peabody Institute (1857-1860) at North Charles Street (Washington Place) and East Mount Vernon Place (East Monument Street). He designed structures for Baltimore's extensive Druid Hill Park, then beyond the 1818 northwest city limits, purchased for the city in 1860, and designed by Howard Daniels, Baltimore City Park Commissioners' landscape designer and John H.B. Latrobe, who designed the gateways to the park and the alterations made to the early-19th century Col. Nicholas Rogers mansion "Druid Hill" that already stood on the site. Druid Hill Park ranks with Frederick Law Olmsted's Central Park in Manhattan in New York City, begun in 1859, and Fairmount Park in Philadelphia as the oldest landscaped public parks in the United States. Among Frederick's playful structures for Druid Hill Park in Moorish and Chinese styles is the Chinese Station for the horse street car system erected in 1864 and the Moorish Station, which were stops on a narrow-gauge railroad that once wound through the park.

== Baltimore City Hall ==
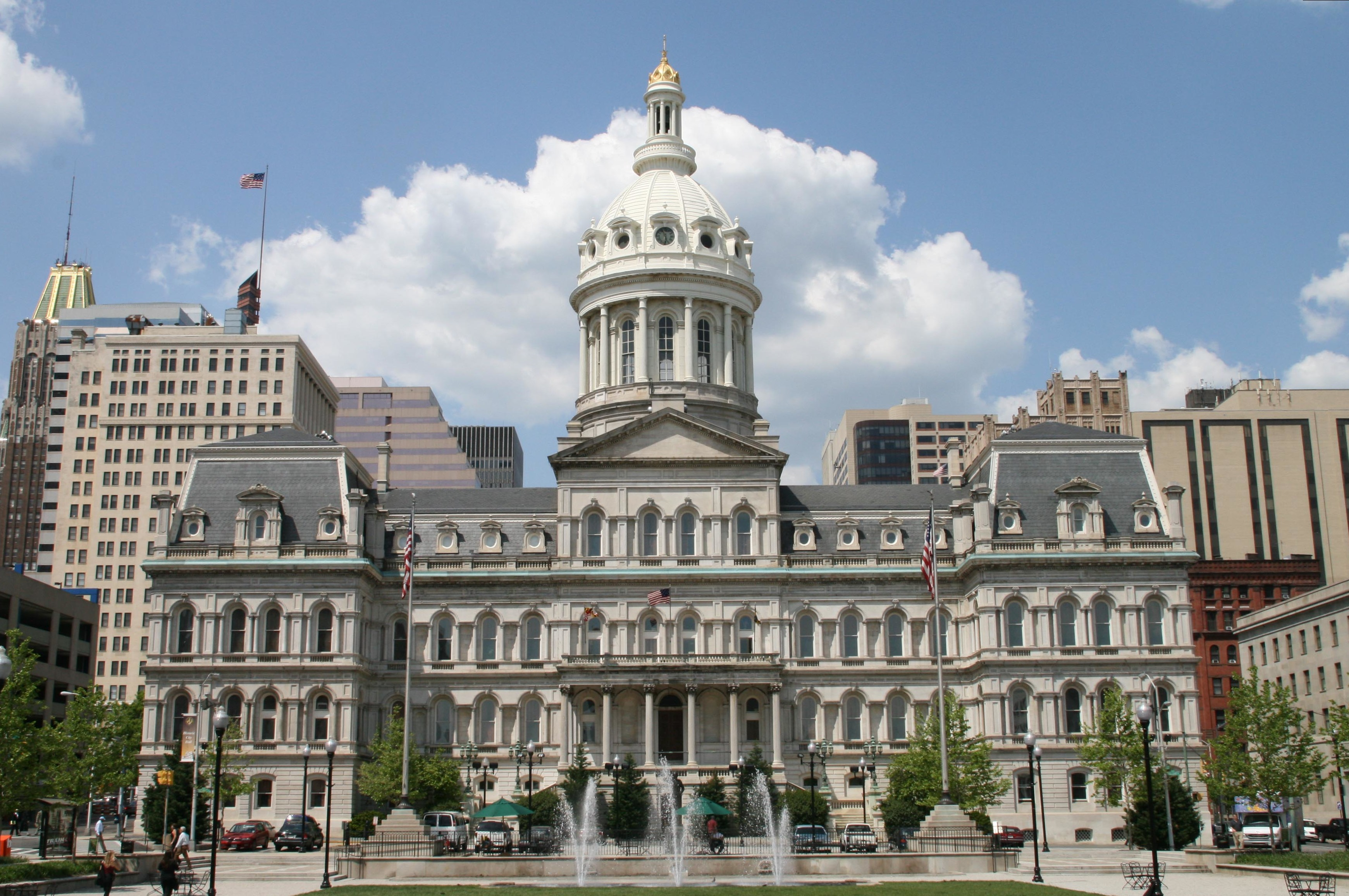
Baltimore City Hall

The commission for the Baltimore City Hall, 100 Holiday Street, was awarded after a design competition to Frederick, a complete unknown and not quite twenty, in the fateful year 1860. The Civil War intervened, and construction finally got under way in 1867. Frederick's design looked to the new additions to the Palais du Louvre, completed under Hector Lefuel in 1857, and well publicized to professionals and architects alike through engravings, lithographs and description; its high Mansard roofs, bold corner pavilions, richly framed dormers are reflected in Frederick's City Hall, above which rises the central dome, 227 feet (69 m) high, above an interior rotunda 119 feet (36 m) high. Twin interior courts provided every room with natural light.

== Marriage ==
In 1865, he married Mary Everist. In July 1876, their only child, Katherine, was born. They lived in a home at 1118 St. Paul Street, designed and built by him.

== Baltimore's German Community ==
His German ethnic background attracted a number of commissions from Baltimore's large German community, including the German Correspondent (a German-American newspaper) building, completed in 1869 on a prominent corner lot on Baltimore Avenue. It had three main floors and an attic behind French mansards, with a marble-clad facing with Venetian-Gothic windows. He also completed a German orphanage (1873), a German old people's home (Greisenheim in the Irvington neighborhood of Southwest Baltimore), and residences and breweries for prominent brewers.

== Maryland State House ==
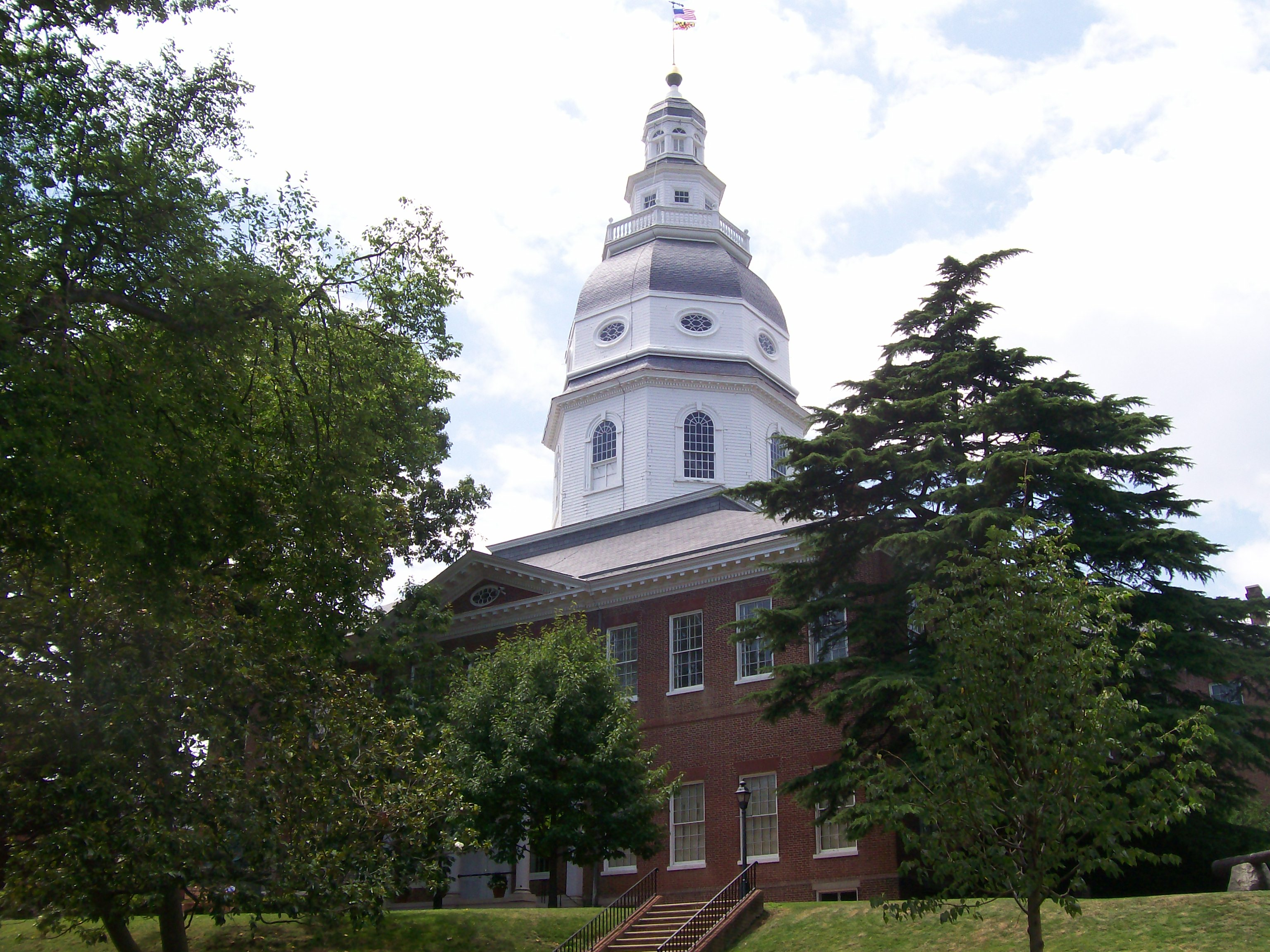
State House, Annapolis

In 1876, Frederick was hired by the Maryland General Assembly to supervise renovations to the then aging Maryland State House. $32,000 was originally appropriated for the project, but the final cost was more than $100,000. most of the cost overrun was due to the necessity of excavations for a new cellar to house two new furnaces and a hot water apparatus to properly heat the building. In 1878 the General Assembly called for an investigation of the cost overrun. After taking testimony from artisans and laborers who had worked on the project, the General Assembly decided to pay the subcontractors, but not Frederick. Frederick would later refuse requests by the state of Maryland to turn over his detailed measurements and architectural drawings.

== Retirement and death ==
In 1903, George Frederick retired. In 1868, he had founded the Baltimore chapter of the American Institute of Architects. Since its creation, he had been a charter member and was given a Fellowship in 1877. After retirement, he sat on the Board of Directors.

In 1923, he lost his wife to a brain hemorrhage. In 1924, George died of the same cause at his residence at the Poplar Apartments, Roland Avenue. He, his wife, and daughter, who died in 1949, are buried in New Cathedral. Though he witnessed the Baltimore Fire of 1904 that destroyed many of his creations, one obituary read: “Mr. George A. Frederick, in his long life of 81 years, never had to complain of lack of employment or lack of appreciation.
