= Baltimore City Hall =

Official seat of government of Baltimore, Maryland, US

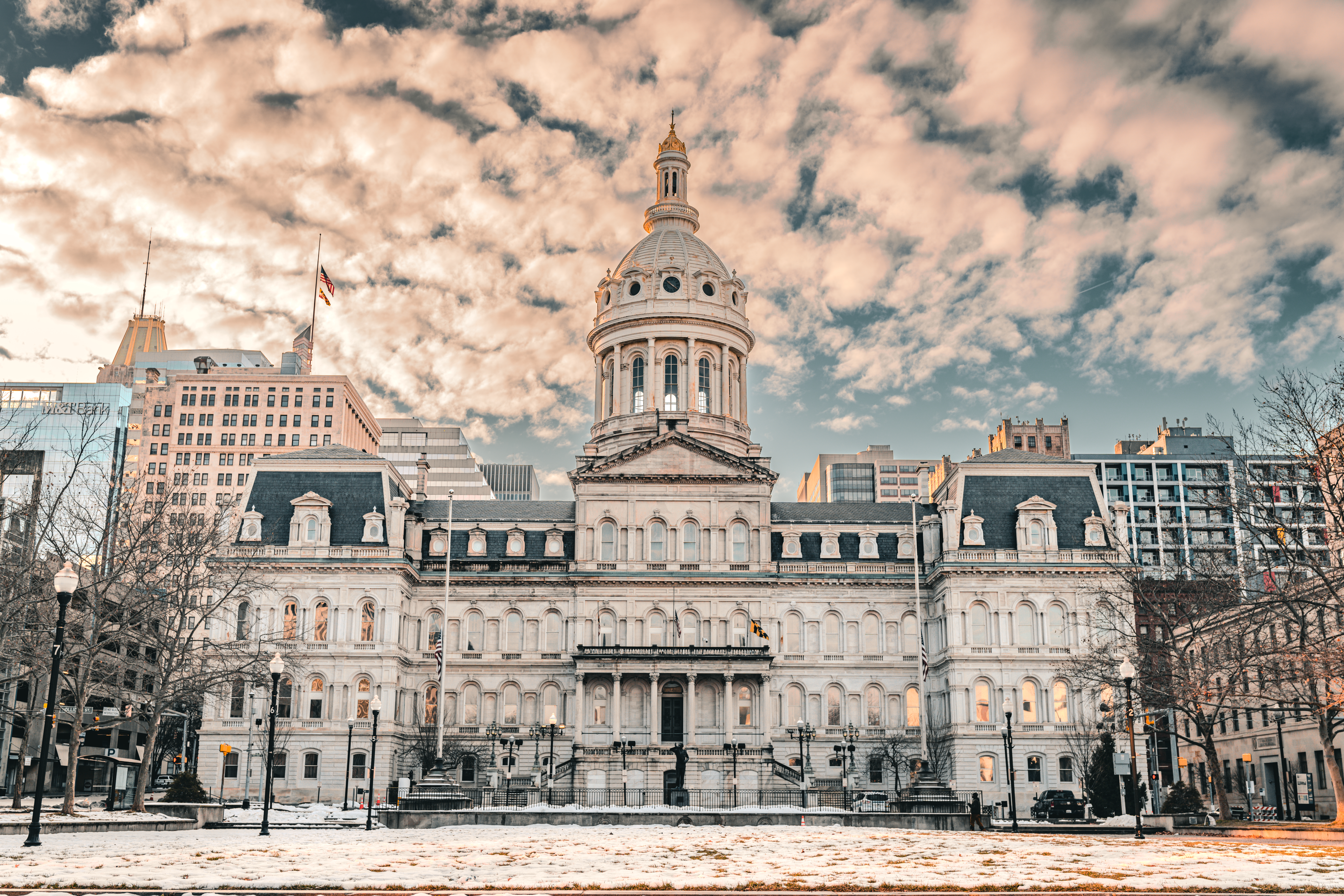

General information
- Architectural style: Second Empire
- Location: 100 North Holliday St., Baltimore, Maryland
- Coordinates: 39°17′27.1″N 76°36′38.5″W
- Completed: 1867–1875

Design and construction
- Architects: George A. Frederick, Wendel Bollman

U.S. National Register of Historic Places
- Designated: May 8, 1973
- Reference no.: 73002180

Baltimore City Landmark
- Designated: 1971

Baltimore City Hall is the official seat of government of the City of Baltimore, in the State of Maryland. The City Hall houses the offices of the Mayor and those of the City Council of Baltimore. The building also hosts the city Comptroller, some various city departments, agencies and boards/commissions along with the historic chambers of the Baltimore City Council. Situated on a city block bounded by East Lexington Street on the north, Guilford Avenue (formerly North Street) on the west, East Fayette Street on the south and North Holliday Street with City Hall Plaza and the War Memorial Plaza to the east, the six-story structure was designed by the then 22-year-old new architect, George Aloysius Frederick (1842–1924) in the Second Empire style, a Baroque revival, with prominent Mansard roofs with richly-framed dormers, and two floors of a repeating Serlian window motif over an urbanely rusticated basement.

== History ==
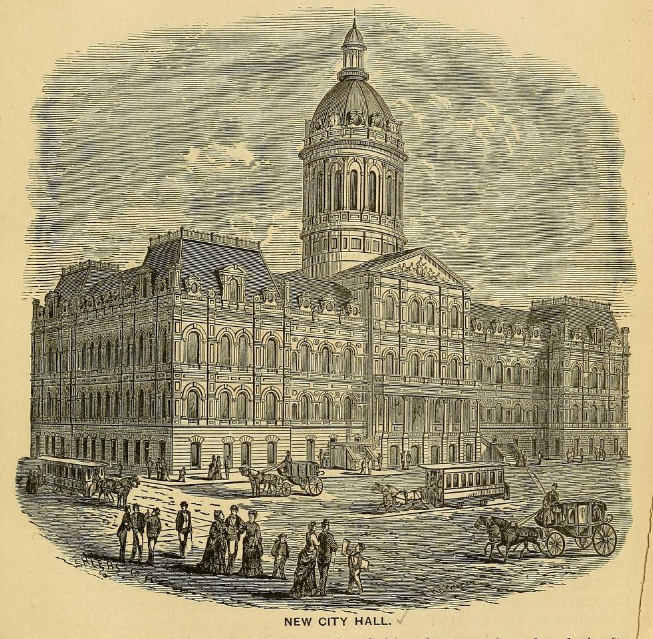
City Hall in 1873

=== Early years ===
In its early years, Baltimore city government met in a series of buildings that it purchased or leased, including the Maryland Insurance Company building on South Street from 1801 to approximately 1812; the Baltimore Dancing Assembly Rooms at the northeast corner of Holliday and East Streets (later Fayette Street) from 1818 to 1823; the Baltimore Exchange Company from 1823 to 1830; and Peale's Baltimore Museum and Gallery of Fine Arts from 1830 until city government moved into the new City Hall in the spring of 1875. At the laying of the cornerstone for the new building on October 18, 1867, speaker John H.B. Latrobe noted of the museum location that "the First Branch held its sessions in what was formerly the very modest picture gallery of Peale's Museum, and the Second Branch succeeded a collection of stuffed animals in an adjacent room."

=== Baltimore City Hall ===
The site for the new building was selected and some designs were submitted before the American Civil War. The cornerstone for the building, under Frederick's new design, was not laid until 1867; construction was completed eight years later. At a cost of more than $2 million (in 1870s money), the Baltimore City Hall is built largely of many courses and rows of thicknesses of brick with the exterior walls faced with white marble. The marble alone, quarried in Baltimore and Baltimore County (famous "Beaver Dam" quarry), cost $957,000.

=== Renovations ===
By the end of World War II, City Hall was showing signs of age and deterioration. The slate roof leaked, the exterior marble was eroding in places and the heating, cooling and electrical systems needed to be replaced. Even the cast iron dome's fastenings had rusted through and many plates were cracked. In 1959, 15 pounds of iron ornament came loose and plunged 150 feet into the Board of Estimates hearing room. In 1974 the city voted to renovate the old city hall rather than build a new one. Architectural Heritage Inc., in association with Meyers, D'Aleo and Patton Inc., local architects, were retained to begin the design. The ceremonial chambers were restored and the office space was doubled. In the process the dome was disassembled and put back together. Two years and $10.5 million later the Mayor, the City Council and other city departments moved back into the building. Usable space was increased almost twofold after the renovation, by fitting in two extra floors, by replacing dead storage space in the basement with offices, and by moving corridor walls to maximize office space.

In 2009, a building survey found that sections of the building's marble exterior were cracked and crumbling due to age. The city approved spending $483,000 for repairs to be made the same year.

In 2008, the City Hall's bell "Lord Baltimore", cast in 1887, was repaired by its original manufacturer, McShane Bell Foundry.

== Incidents ==
On October 11, 1883, James F. Busey, a Democratic ward operative, was shot and killed outside of City Hall. The man who shot him, William T. Harig, was also a Democrat from another ward. The two got into a political argument and after some punches were thrown, both men drew their pistols and began firing at each other in rapid succession. Busey fired wildly; Harig did not, hitting Busey four times. Harig was taken into custody and charged with murder.

Nearly 93 years later, Charles A. Hopkins stormed the temporary City Hall with a hand gun and killed a city councilman. On April 13, 1976, Hopkins, angered that his restaurant was being shut down, killed Dominic Leone, a member of the Baltimore City Council. Hopkins also wounded another city councilman, a police officer and a mayoral aide during the shooting spree. Hopkins was found not guilty by reason of insanity in the shootings but has spent most of his life since then at mental health facilities. In 2007, a Baltimore judge reduced his level of confinement.
