= Baltimore =

Largest city in Maryland, United States

- Independent city
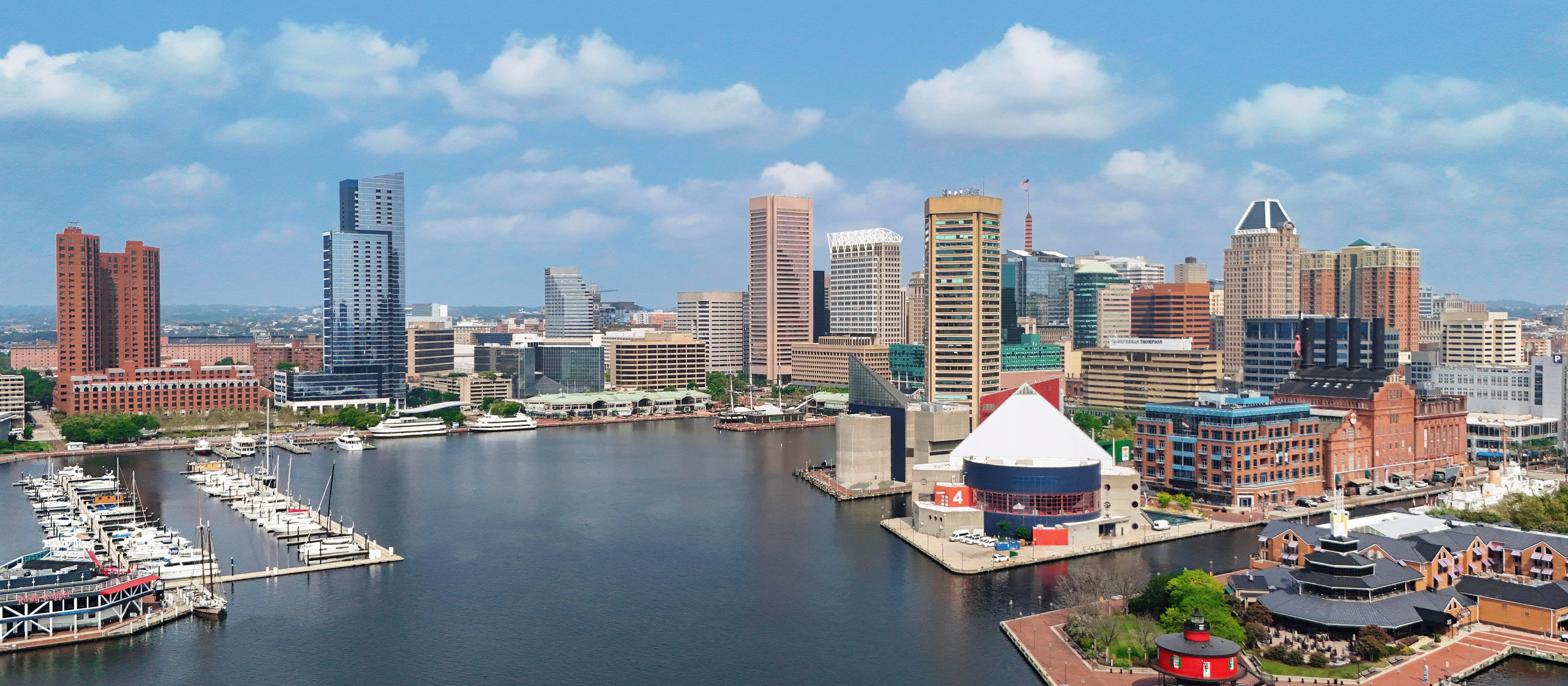
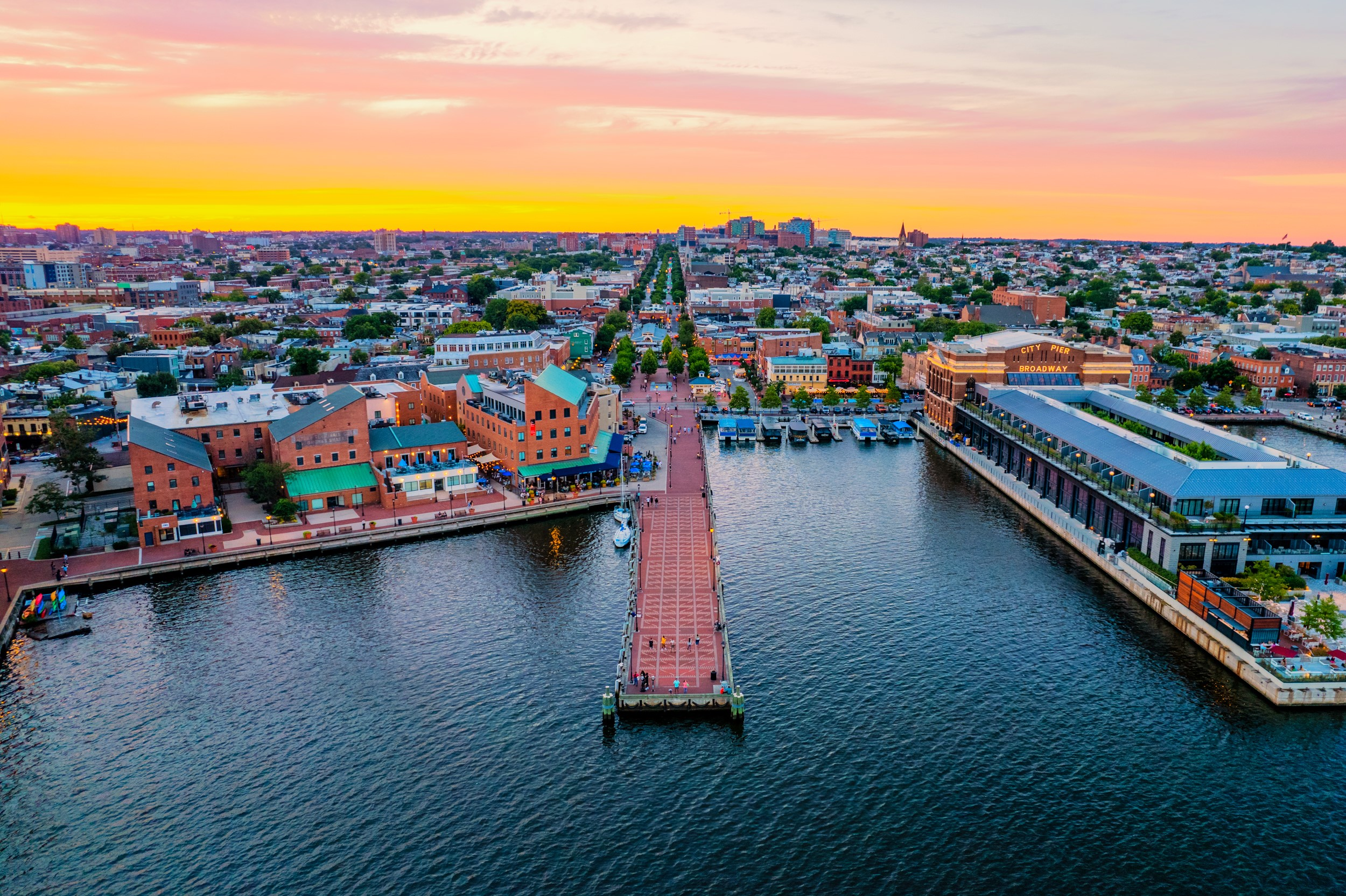
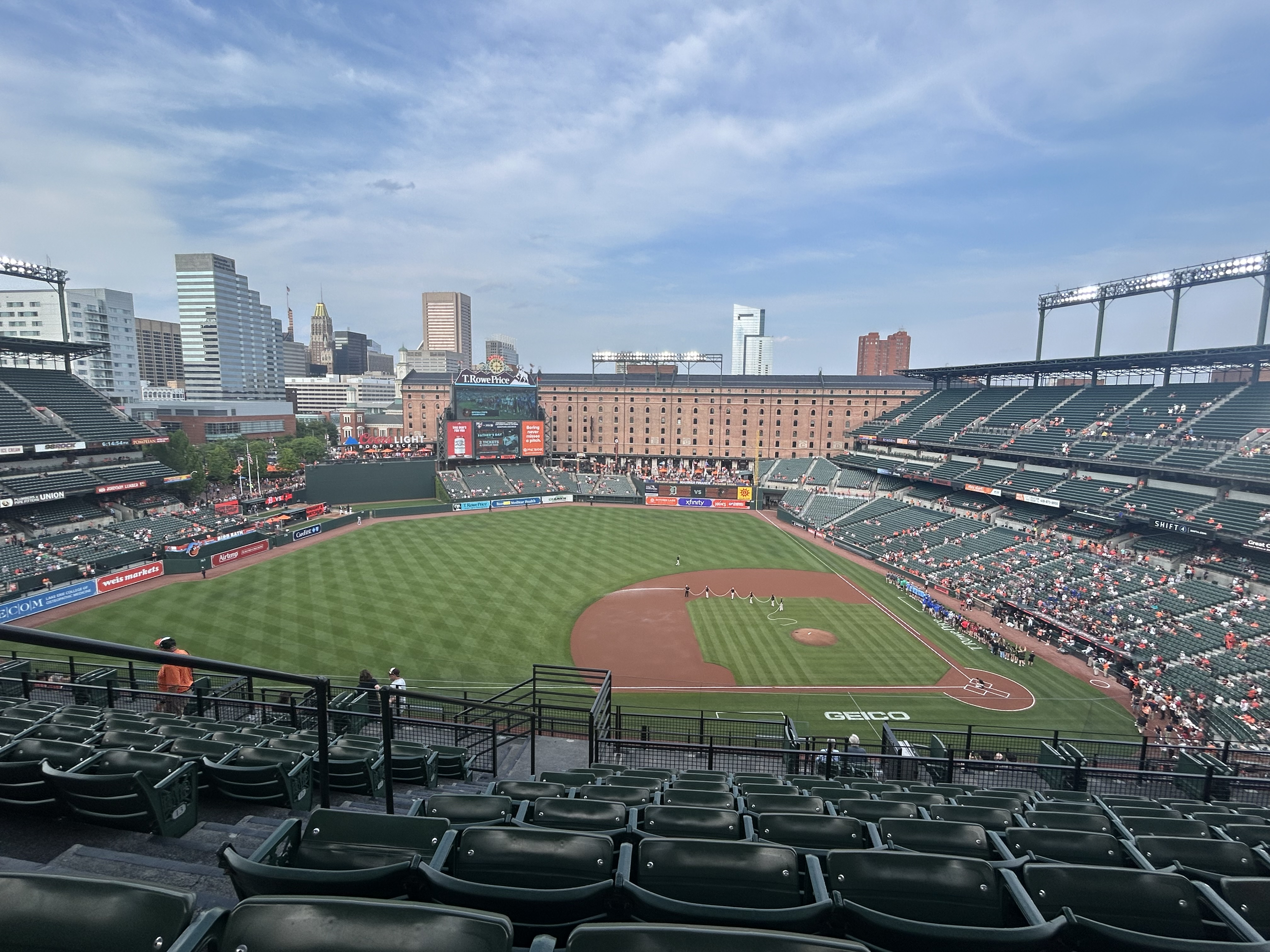
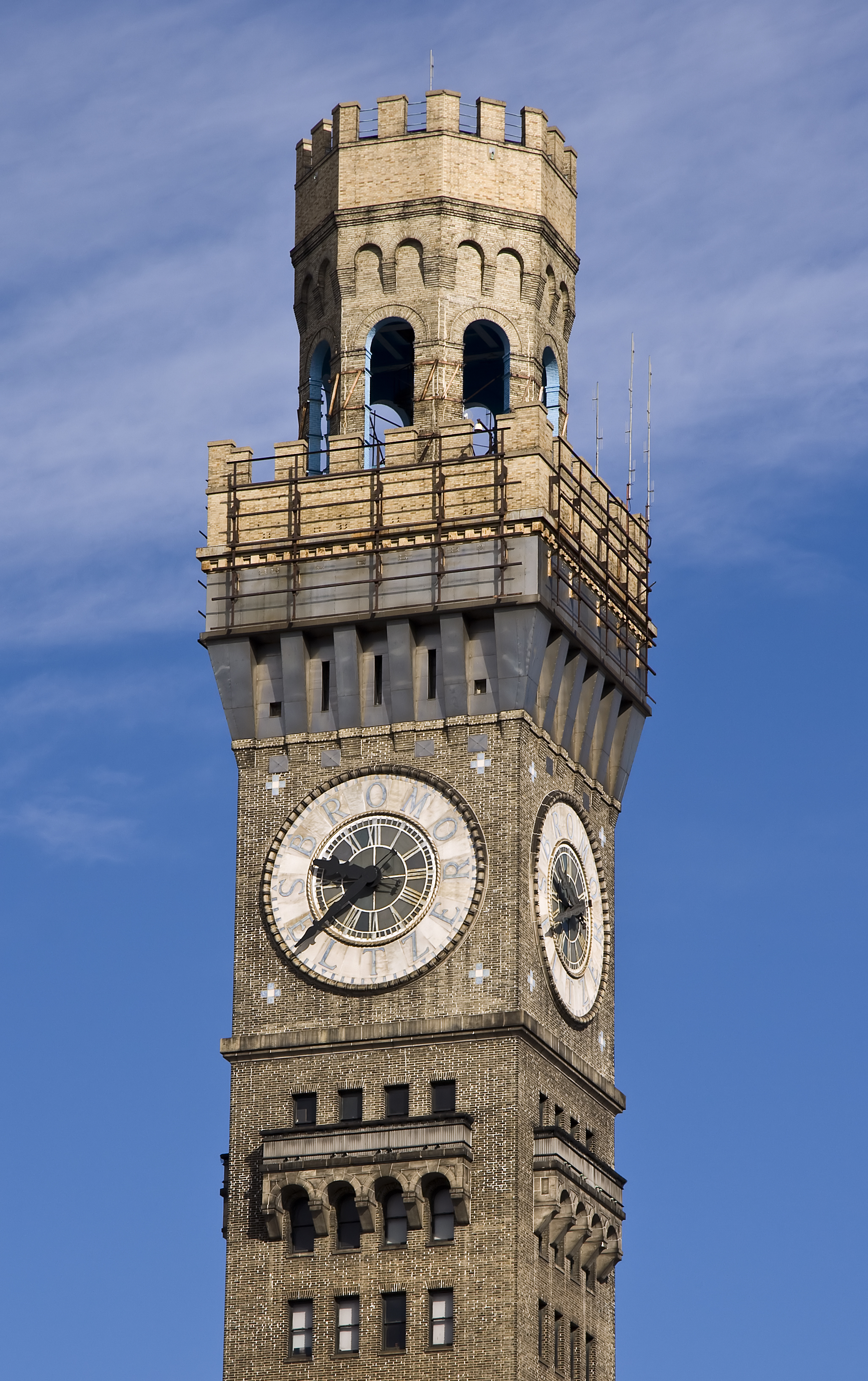
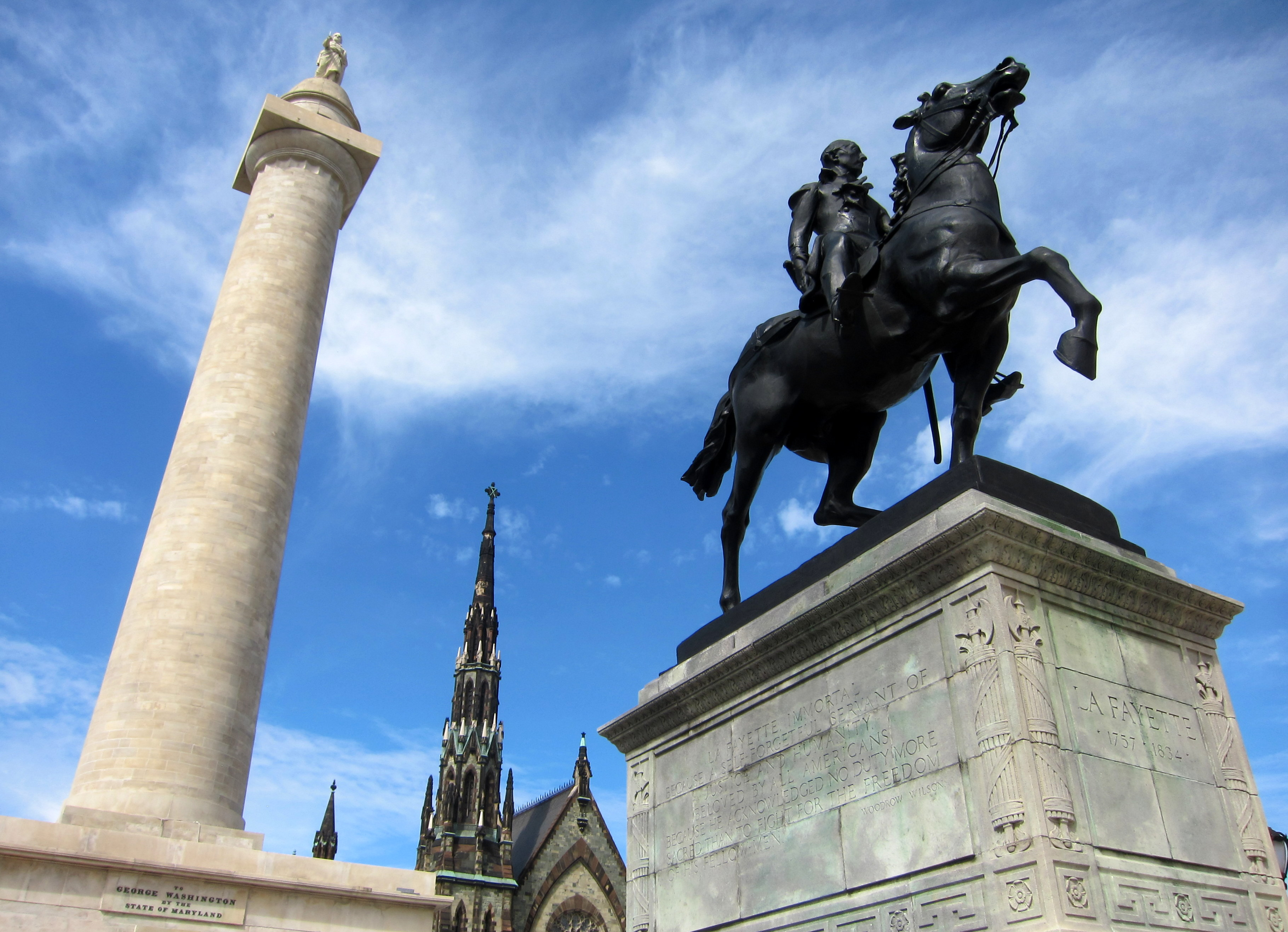
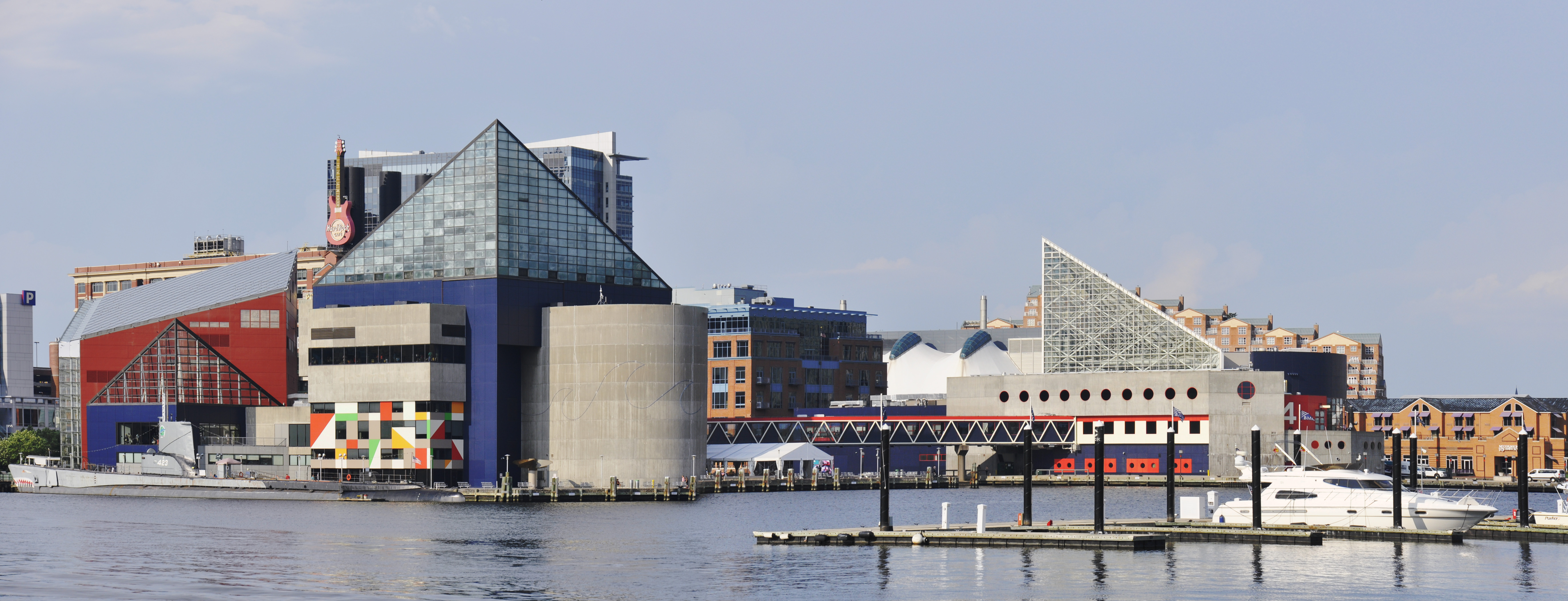
- The Inner Harbor skyline Fells Point Oriole Park at Camden Yards Emerson Tower Washington and Lafayette Monuments National Aquarium

- Flag Seal
- Nicknames: Charm City; B'more; Mobtown
- Mottoes: "The Greatest City in America", "Get in on it.", "Believe"
- Interactive map of Baltimore
- Location within Maryland Location within the United States
- Coordinates: 39°17′22″N 76°36′55″W
- Country: United States
- State: Maryland
- City: Baltimore
- Historic colony: Province of Maryland
- County: None (Independent city)
- Founded: August 8, 1729; 297 years ago
- Incorporated: 1796–1797
- Independent city: 1851
- Named for: Cecil Calvert, 2nd Baron Baltimore

Government
  - Type: Mayor–council
  - Body: Baltimore City Council
  - Mayor: Brandon Scott (D)
  - City Council: Council members: Zeke Cohen (President); Mark Parker (1); Danielle McCray (2); Ryan Dorsey (3); Mark Conway (4); Isaac "Yitzy" Schleifer (5); Sharon Green Middleton (6); James Torrence (7); Paris Gray (8); John T. Bullock (9); Phylicia Porter (10); Zac Blanchard (11); Jermaine Jones (12); Antonio Glover (13); Odette Ramos (14)
  - Houses of Delegates: Delegates: Marlon Amprey (40) (D); Frank M. Conaway Jr. (40) (D); Melissa Wells (40) (D); Sean A. Stinnett (41) (D); Samuel I. Rosenberg (41) (D); Malcolm Ruff (41) (D); Regina T. Boyce (43A) (D); Elizabeth Embry (43A) (D); Jackie Addison (45) (D); Stephanie M. Smith (45) (D); Caylin Young (45) (D); Luke Clippinger (46) (D); Mark Edelson (46) (D); Robbyn Lewis (46) (D)
  - State Senate: State Senators: Antonio Hayes (40) (D); Dalya Attar (41) (D); Mary Washington (43) (D); Cory V. McCray (45) (D); Bill Ferguson (46) (D)

Area
  - Independent city: 92.05 sq mi (238.41 km^{2})
  - Land: 80.95 sq mi (209.65 km^{2})
  - Water: 11.10 sq mi (28.76 km^{2}) 12.1%
- Elevation: 0–492 ft (0–150 m)

Population (2020)
  - Independent city: 585,708
  - Estimate (2025): 569,997 ▼
  - Rank: 83rd in North America; 30th in the United States; 1st in Maryland
  - Density: 7,235.8/sq mi (2,793.74/km^{2})
  - Urban: 2,212,038 (US: 20th)
  - Urban density: 3,378/sq mi (1,304.1/km^{2})
  - Metro: 2,859,024 (US: 22nd)
- Demonym: Baltimorean

GDP (Nominal, 2023)
  - Independent city: $61.954 billion
  - Metro: $259.690 billion
- Time zone: UTC−5 (EST)
  - Summer (DST): UTC−4 (EDT)
- ZIP Codes: ZIP Codes: 21201–21231, 21233–21237, 21239–21241, 21244, 21250–21252, 21263–21265, 21268, 21270, 21273–21275, 21278–21290, 21297–21298
- Area codes: 410, 443, and 667
- Congressional districts: 2nd, 7th
- GNIS feature ID: 597040
- FIPS code: 24-04000
- Website: www.baltimorecity.gov

Baltimore, also known as Baltimore City (Note: To distinguish it from Baltimore County and the general metropolitan area) is the most populous city in the U.S. state of Maryland. It is the 30th-most-populous U.S. city, with a population of 585,708 at the 2020 census and estimated at 569,997 in 2025; the Baltimore metropolitan area, at 2.86 million residents, is the 22nd-largest metropolitan area in the nation. The city is also part of the Washington–Baltimore combined statistical area, which had a population of 9.97 million in 2020. Baltimore was designated as an independent city by the Constitution of Maryland (Note: The form and type of government of the city is described by Article XI of the State Constitution.) in 1851. Though not located under the jurisdiction of any county in the state, it forms part of the Central Maryland region together with the surrounding county that shares its name.

The land that is present-day Baltimore was once used as hunting ground by Paleo-Indians. In the early 1600s, the Susquehannock began to hunt there. People from the Province of Maryland established the Port of Baltimore in 1706 to support the tobacco trade with Europe and established the Town of Baltimore in 1729. During the American Revolutionary War, the Second Continental Congress briefly moved its deliberations to Henry Fite House from December 1776 to February 1777 prior to the capture of Philadelphia by British troops, which permitted Baltimore to serve briefly as the nation's capital before it returned to Philadelphia. The Battle of Baltimore was pivotal during the War of 1812. During the Pratt Street Riot of 1861, the city was the site of some of the earliest violence associated with the American Civil War. The British bombardment of Fort McHenry led revolutionary Francis Scott Key to write the poem "The Star-Spangled Banner", which was designated as the U.S. national anthem in 1931.

The Baltimore and Ohio Railroad, the nation's oldest, was built in 1830 and reinforced Baltimore's status as a transportation hub, giving producers in the Midwest and Appalachia access to the city's port. Baltimore's Inner Harbor was the second-leading port of entry for immigrants to the United States, after New York's Ellis Island, making Baltimore a major manufacturing center. After a decline in heavy industry and a restructuring of the rail industry, Baltimore shifted to a service-oriented economy. Johns Hopkins Hospital and University are now the city's top employers. Baltimore is also home to the Baltimore Orioles of Major League Baseball and the Baltimore Ravens of the National Football League. It is ranked as a Gamma− world city by the Globalization and World Cities Research Network.

The city is home to some of the earliest National Register Historic Districts in the nation, including Fells Point, Federal Hill, and Mount Vernon. Baltimore has more public statues and monuments per capita than any other U.S. city. Nearly one third of the buildings (over 65,000) are designated as historic in the National Register, more than any other U.S. city. Baltimore has 66 National Register Historic Districts and 33 local historic districts.

== Etymology ==
The city is named after Cecil Calvert, 2nd Baron Baltimore, an English politician and lawyer who was a founding proprietor of the Province of Maryland. The Calverts took the title Barons Baltimore from Baltimore Manor, an estate they were granted by the Crown in County Longford as part of the plantations of Ireland. Baltimore is an anglicization of Baile an Tí Mhóir, meaning "town of the big house" in Irish.

== History ==
=== Pre-settlement ===
The Baltimore area was inhabited by Native Americans since at least the 10th millennium BC, when Paleo-Indians first settled in the region. One Paleo-Indian site and several Archaic period and Woodland period archaeological sites have been identified in Baltimore, including four from the Late Woodland period. In December 2021, several Woodland period Native American artifacts were found in Herring Run Park in northeast Baltimore, dating 5,000 to 9,000 years ago. The finding followed a period of dormancy in Baltimore City archaeological findings, which had persisted since the 1980s. During the Late Woodland period, the archaeological culture known as the Potomac Creek complex resided in the area from Baltimore south to the Rappahannock River in present-day Virginia.

=== 17th century ===
In the early 1600s, the immediate Baltimore vicinity was sparsely populated, if at all, by Native Americans. The Baltimore County area northward was used as hunting grounds by the Susquehannock living in the lower Susquehanna River valley. This Iroquoian-speaking people "controlled all of the upper tributaries of the Chesapeake" but "refrained from much contact with Powhatan in the Potomac region" and south into Virginia. Pressured by the Susquehannock, the Piscataway tribe, an Algonquian-speaking people, stayed well south of the Baltimore area and inhabited primarily the north bank of the Potomac River in what are now Charles and southern Prince George's counties in the coastal areas south of the Fall Line.

European colonization of Maryland began in earnest with the arrival of the merchant ship The Ark carrying 140 colonists at St. Clement's Island in the Potomac River on March 25, 1634. Europeans then began to settle the area further north, in what is now Baltimore County. Since Maryland was a colony, Baltimore's streets were named to show loyalty to the mother country, e.g. King, Queen, King George and Caroline streets. The original county seat, known today as Old Baltimore, was located on Bush River within the present-day Aberdeen Proving Ground. The colonists engaged in sporadic warfare with the Susquehannock, whose numbers dwindled primarily from new infectious diseases, such as smallpox, endemic among the Europeans. In 1661, David Jones claimed the area known today as Jonestown on the east bank of the Jones Falls stream.

=== 18th century ===
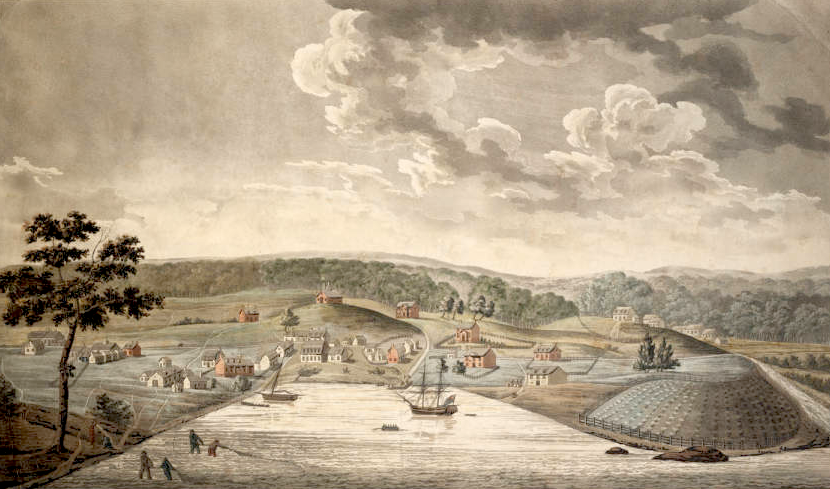
Baltimore, then known as Baltimore Town, in 1752

The colonial General Assembly of Maryland created the Port of Baltimore at old Whetstone Point, which is now Locust Point, in 1706 for the tobacco trade. The Town of Baltimore, on the west side of the Jones Falls, was founded on August 8, 1729, when the Governor of Maryland signed an act allowing "the building of a Town on the North side of the Patapsco River". Surveyors began laying out the town on January 12, 1730. By 1752 the town had just 27 homes, including a church and two taverns. Jonestown and Fells Point had been settled to the east. The three settlements, covering 60 acres (24 ha), became a commercial hub, and in 1768 were designated as the county seat.

The first printing press was introduced to the city in 1765 by Nicholas Hasselbach, whose equipment was later used in the printing of Baltimore's first newspapers, The Maryland Journal and The Baltimore Advertiser, first published by William Goddard in 1773.

Baltimore grew swiftly in the 18th century, its plantations producing grain and tobacco for sugar-producing colonies in the Caribbean. The profit from sugar encouraged the cultivation of cane in the Caribbean and the importation of food by planters there. Since Baltimore was the county seat, a courthouse was built in 1768 to serve both the city and county. Its square was a center of community meetings and discussions.

Baltimore established its public market system in 1763. Lexington Market, founded in 1782, is one of the oldest continuously operating public markets in the United States today. Lexington Market was also a center of slave trading. Enslaved Black people were sold at numerous sites through the downtown area, with sales advertised in The Baltimore Sun. Both tobacco and sugar cane were labor-intensive crops.

In 1774, Baltimore established the first post office system in what became the United States, and the first water company chartered in the newly independent nation, Baltimore Water Company, 1792.

Baltimore played a part in the American Revolution. City leaders such as Jonathan Plowman Jr. led many residents to resist British taxes, and merchants signed agreements refusing to trade with Britain. The Second Continental Congress met in the Henry Fite House from December 1776 to February 1777, effectively making the city the capital of the United States during this period.

Baltimore, Jonestown, and Fells Point were incorporated as the City of Baltimore in 1796–1797.

=== 19th century ===
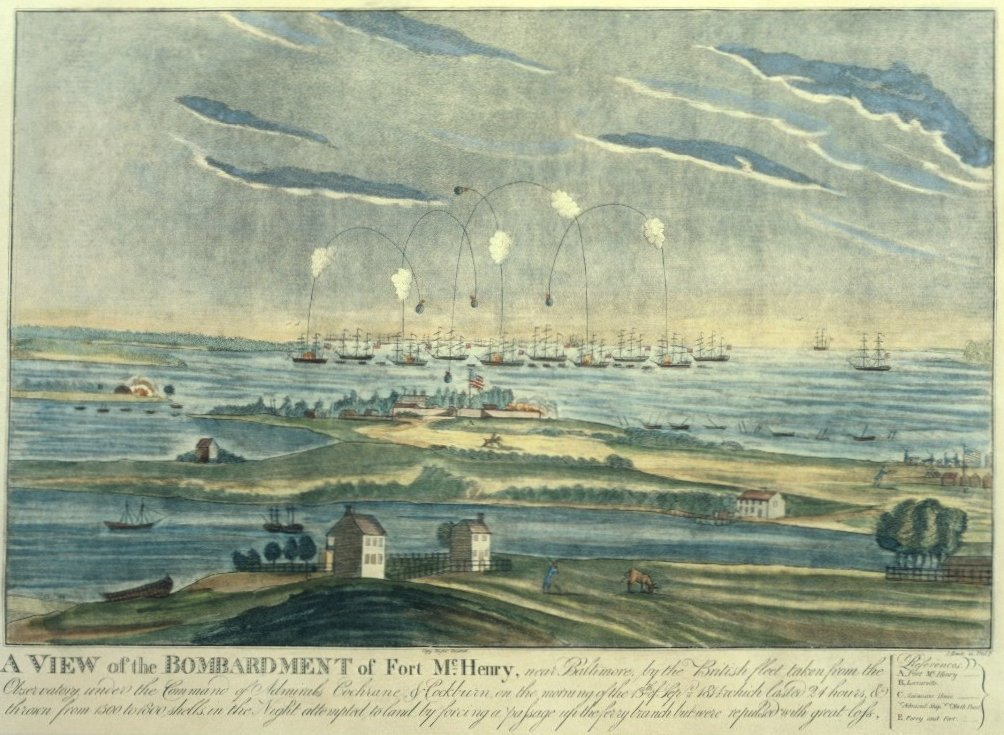
An American flag flying at Fort McHenry following the fort's bombing by the Royal Navy in the Battle of Baltimore in 1814 inspired Francis Scott Key to write the poem that later became the "Star Spangled Banner".

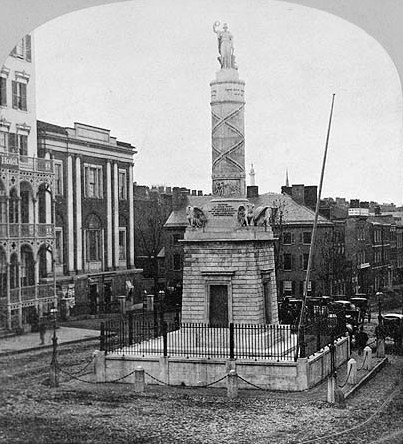
The Battle Monument, the official emblem of Baltimore

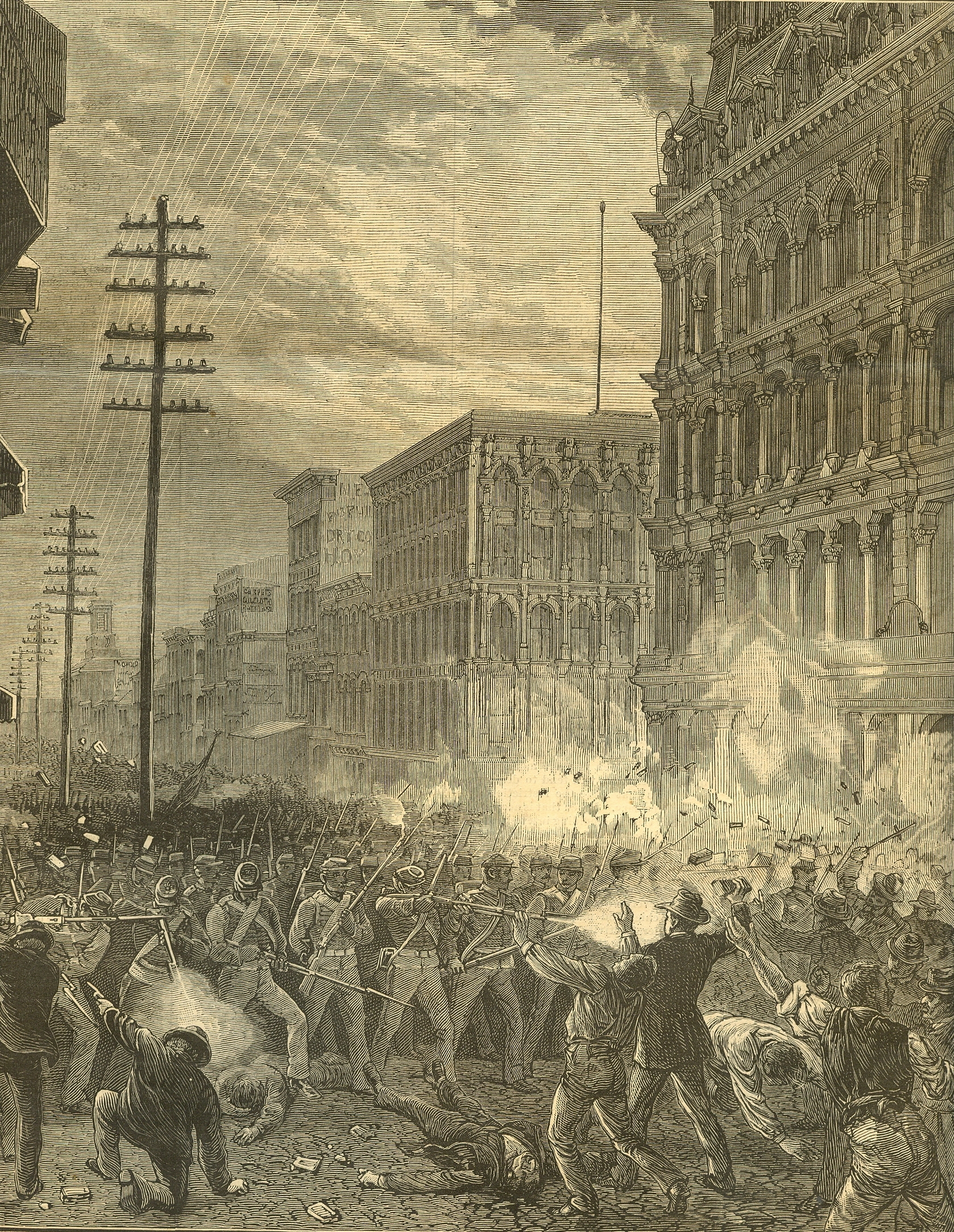
The 6th Cavalry Regiment fighting railroad strikers in Baltimore on July 20, 1877

The city remained a part of surrounding Baltimore County and continued to serve as its county seat from 1768 to 1851, after which it became an independent city.

The British bombardment of Baltimore in 1814 inspired the U.S. national anthem, "The Star-Spangled Banner", and the construction of the Battle Monument, which became the city's official emblem. A distinctive local culture started to take shape, and a unique skyline peppered with churches and monuments developed. Baltimore acquired its moniker "The Monumental City" after an 1827 visit to Baltimore by President John Quincy Adams. At an evening function, Adams gave the following toast: "Baltimore: the Monumental City—May the days of her safety be as prosperous and happy, as the days of her dangers have been trying and triumphant."

Baltimore pioneered the use of gas lighting in 1816, and its population grew rapidly in the following decades, with concomitant development of culture and infrastructure. The construction of the federally funded National Road, which later became part of U.S. Route 40, and the private Baltimore and Ohio Railroad (B. & O.) made Baltimore a major shipping and manufacturing center by linking the city with major markets in the Midwest. By 1820 its population had reached 60,000, and its economy had shifted from its base in tobacco plantations to sawmilling, shipbuilding, and textile production. These industries benefited from war but successfully shifted into infrastructure development during peacetime.

Baltimore had one of the worst riots of the antebellum South in 1835, when bad investments led to the Baltimore bank riot. It was these riots that led to the city being nicknamed "Mobtown". Soon after the city created the world's first dental college, the Baltimore College of Dental Surgery, in 1840, and shared in the world's first telegraph line, between Baltimore and Washington, D.C., in 1844.

Maryland, a slave state with limited popular support for secession, especially in the three counties of Southern Maryland, remained part of the Union during the American Civil War, following the 55–12 vote by the Maryland General Assembly against secession. In February 1861, a plot in Baltimore to assassinate President-elect Abraham Lincoln was foiled by agents of the Pinkerton National Detective Agency. Lincoln was able to pass through the city unnoticed, and arrived in Washington to be inaugurated a little more than a week later. Later, the Union's strategic occupation of the city in 1861 ensured Maryland would not further consider secession. The Union's capital of Washington, D.C. was well-situated to impede Baltimore and Maryland's communication or commerce with the Confederacy. Baltimore experienced some of the first casualties of the Civil War on April 19, 1861, when Union Army soldiers en route from President Street Station to Camden Yards clashed with a secessionist mob in the Pratt Street riot.

In the midst of the Long Depression that followed the Panic of 1873, the Baltimore and Ohio Railroad company attempted to lower its workers' wages, leading to strikes and riots in the city and beyond. Strikers clashed with the National Guard, leaving 10 dead and 25 wounded. settlement movement work in Baltimore began in 1893 with the founding of the Lawrence House on West Lombard Street.

=== 20th century ===
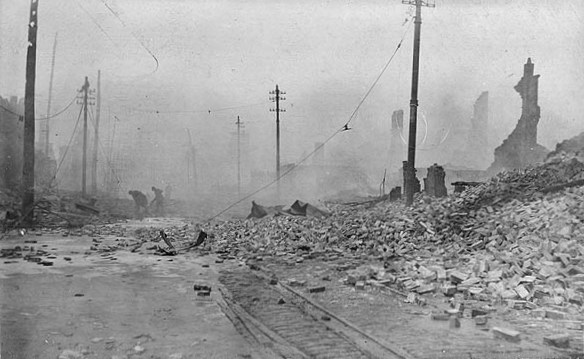
The Great Baltimore Fire in 1904 photographed from Pratt and Gay streets; the fire destroyed over 1,500 buildings in 30 hours.

On February 7, 1904, the Great Baltimore Fire destroyed more than 1,500 buildings and left over 70 blocks of downtown Baltimore burned to the ground. Damage was estimated at $150 million in 1904 dollars. Rebuilding over the following years included improvements in firefighting equipment standards.

In 1910, Baltimore enacted a residential segregation ordinance that restricted African-Americans from moving into majority-White blocks, and White residents from moving into majority-Black blocks. It was the first ordinance of its kind in the United States and became a model for similar laws in other southern cities, although the U.S. Supreme Court later ruled such ordinances unconstitutional in Buchanan v. Warley (1917).

Baltimore expanded through annexations until 1918, when it acquired portions of Baltimore County and Anne Arundel County. A 1948 state constitutional amendment required a local vote in any area proposed for annexation, effectively preventing further expansion of the city's boundaries. During the mid-20th century, migration from the Deep South and white suburbanization changed the city's demographics: the Black share of the population rose from 23.8% in 1950 to 46.4% in 1970.

The Baltimore riot of 1968 followed the assassination of Martin Luther King Jr. on April 4, 1968. Public order was not restored until April 12, and National Guard and federal troops were sent into the city. In 1974, the city again faced major disruption when teachers, municipal workers, and police officers went on strike.

By the early 1970s, the Inner Harbor had declined into an area of abandoned warehouses. Redevelopment began with projects such as the Maryland Science Center in 1976, the Baltimore World Trade Center in 1977, and the Baltimore Convention Center in 1979. Harborplace opened in 1980, followed by the National Aquarium and the Baltimore Museum of Industry in 1981.

In 1992, the Baltimore Orioles moved from Memorial Stadium to Oriole Park at Camden Yards, near the Inner Harbor. The Baltimore Ravens later moved into M&T Bank Stadium, next to Camden Yards, in 1998.

=== 21st century ===
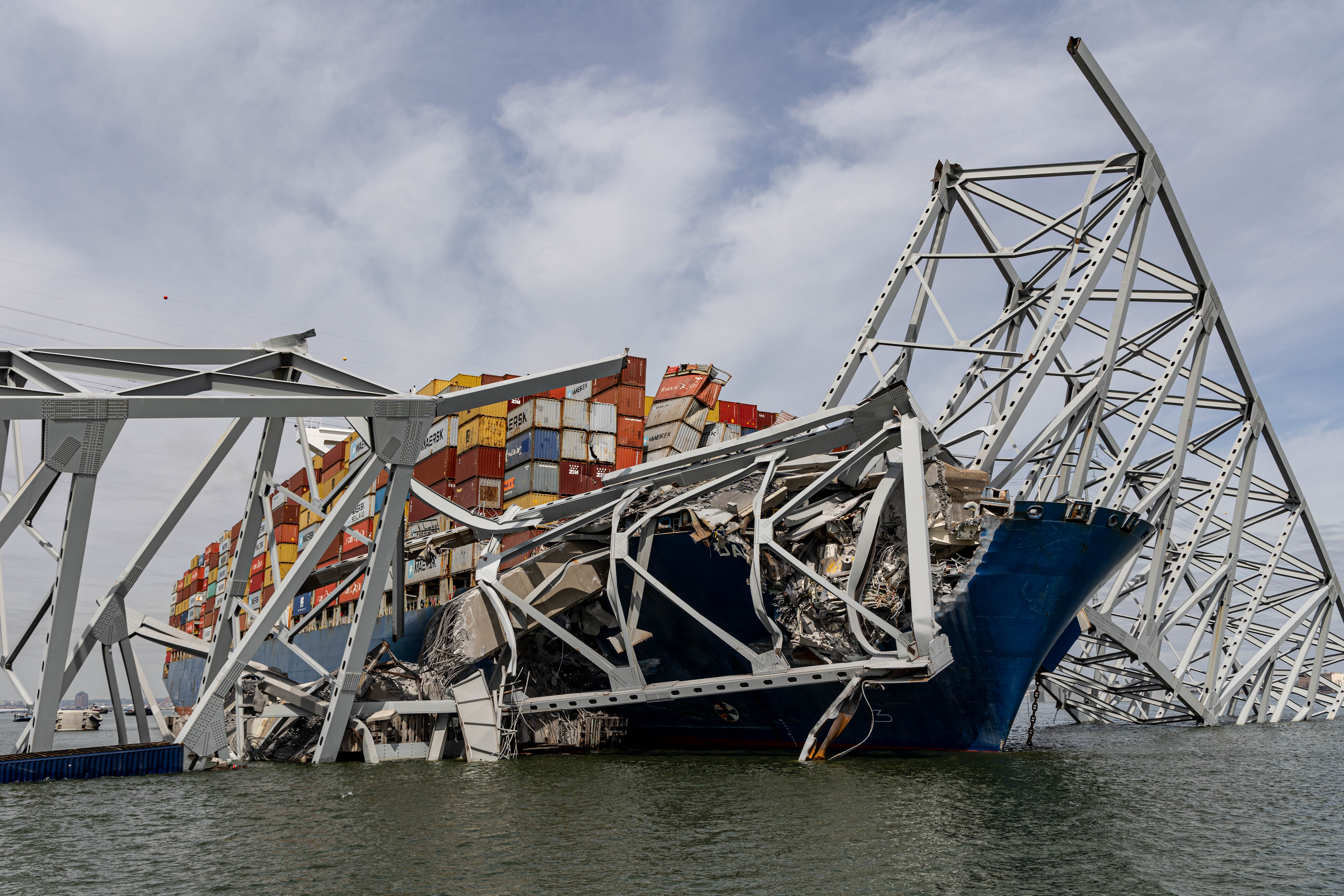
The Francis Scott Key Bridge collapse occurred after the bridge was hit by the MV Dali in 2024.

Baltimore has seen the reopening of the Hippodrome Theatre in 2004, the opening of the Reginald F. Lewis Museum of Maryland African American History & Culture in 2005, and the establishment of the National Slavic Museum in 2012. In April 2012, Johns Hopkins dedicated a $1.1 billion expansion of the Johns Hopkins Hospital, among the largest medical complexes in the United States, comprising the Sheikh Zayed Cardiovascular and Critical Care Tower and the Charlotte R. Bloomberg Children's Center.

In September 2016, the Baltimore City Council approved a $660 million bond deal for the $5.5 billion Port Covington redevelopment project championed by Under Armour founder Kevin Plank and his real estate company Sagamore Development. Port Covington surpassed the Harbor Point development as the largest tax-increment financing deal in Baltimore's history and among the largest urban redevelopment projects in the country. The waterfront development includes a new headquarters for Under Armour along with shops, housing, offices, and manufacturing space.

In the early hours of March 26, 2024, the city's 1.6-mile (2.6 km) Francis Scott Key Bridge, which constituted a southeast portion of the Baltimore Beltway, was struck by a container ship and completely collapsed. A major rescue operation was launched with US authorities attempting to rescue people in the water. Eight construction workers, who were working on the bridge at the time, fell into the Patapsco River. Two people were rescued from the water, and the bodies of the remaining six were all found by May 7. Replacement of the bridge was estimated in May 2024 at a cost approaching $2 billion for a fall 2028 completion.

== Geography ==
Baltimore is in north-central Maryland on the Patapsco River, close to where it empties into the Chesapeake Bay. Baltimore is located on the fall line between the Piedmont Plateau and the Atlantic coastal plain, which divides Baltimore into "lower city" and "upper city". Baltimore's elevation ranges from sea level at the harbor to 480 feet (150 m) in the northwest corner near Pimlico.

In the 2010 census, Baltimore has a total area of 92.1 square miles (239 km^{2}), of which 80.9 sq mi (210 km^{2}) is land and 11.1 sq mi (29 km^{2}) is water. The total area is 12.1 percent water.

Baltimore is almost entirely surrounded by Baltimore County, but is politically independent of it. It is bordered by Anne Arundel County to the south.

=== Cityscape ===
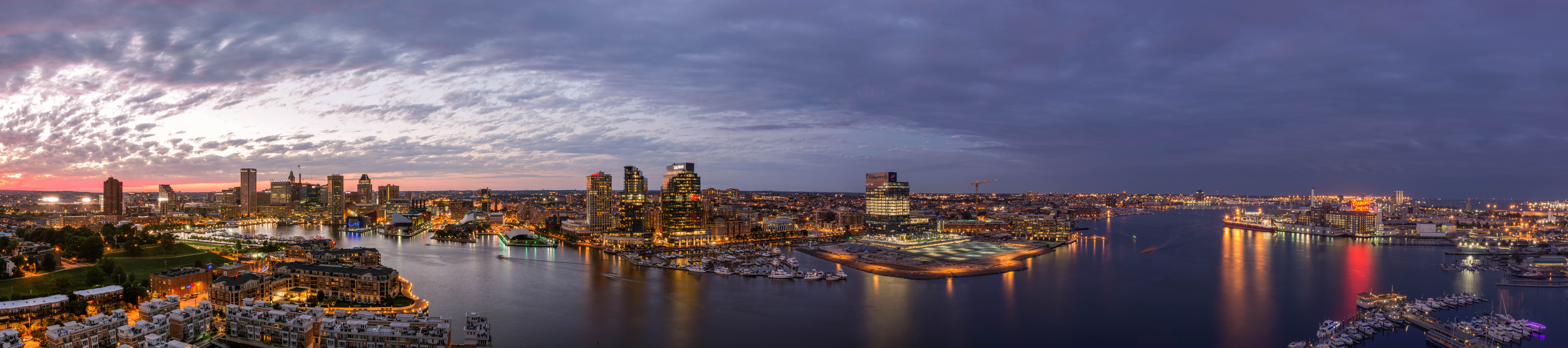
A panoramic view of Baltimore in September 2016, including the Inner and Outer Harbors at dusk, seen from HarborView Condominium

==== Architecture ====
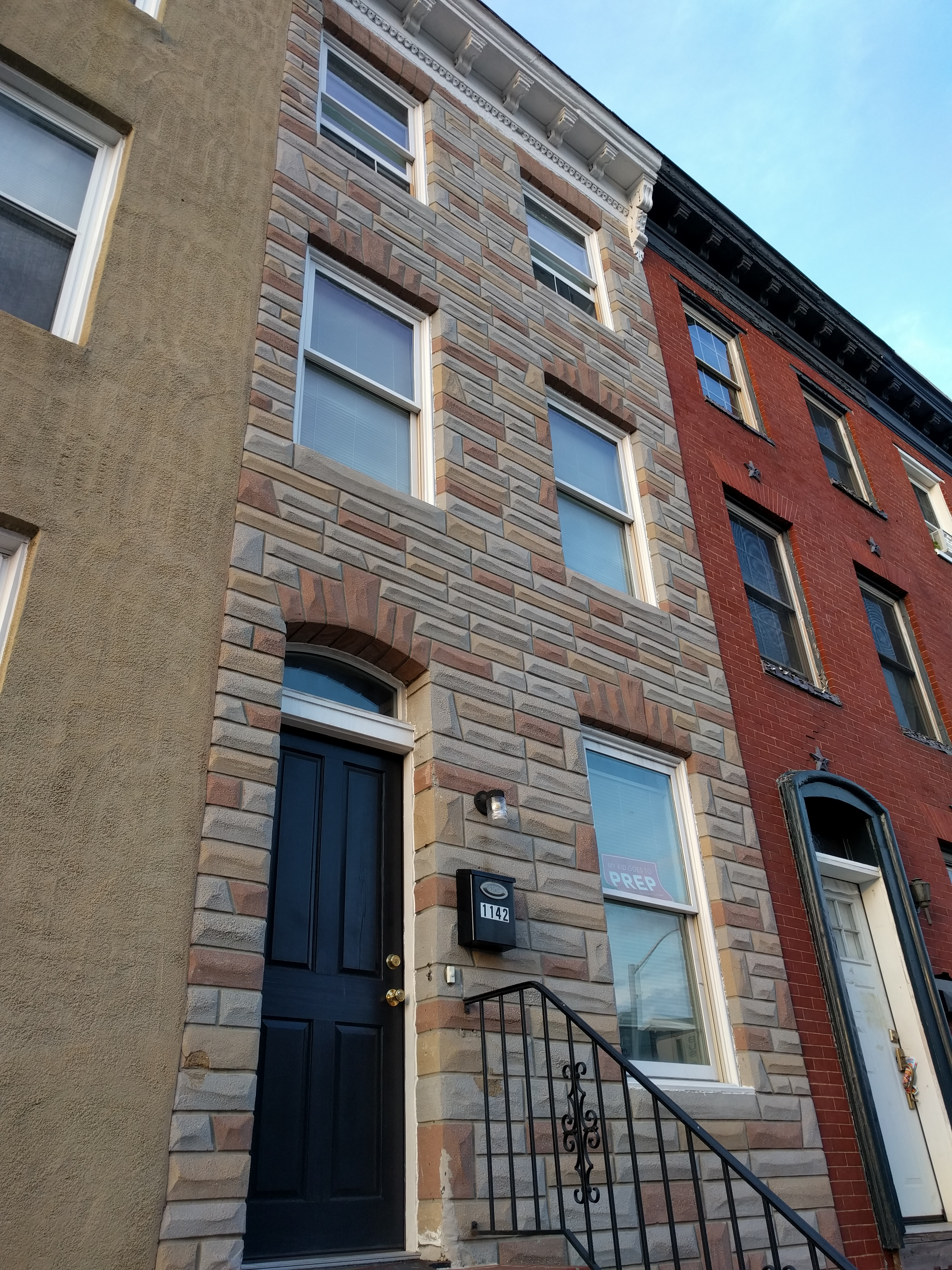
An Italianate rowhouse clad in formstone in West Baltimore

Baltimore exhibits examples from each period of architecture over more than two centuries, and work from architects such as Benjamin Latrobe, George A. Frederick, John Russell Pope, Mies van der Rohe, and I. M. Pei.

Baltimore is rich in architecturally significant buildings in a variety of styles. The Baltimore Basilica (1806–1821) is a neoclassical design by Benjamin Latrobe, and one of the oldest Catholic cathedrals in the United States. In 1813, Robert Cary Long Sr. built for Rembrandt Peale the first substantial structure in the United States designed expressly as a museum. Restored, it is now the Municipal Museum of Baltimore, or popularly the Peale Museum.

The Phoenix Shot Tower (1828), at 234.25 feet (71.40 m) tall, was the tallest building in the United States until the time of the Civil War, and is one of few remaining structures of its kind. It was constructed without the use of exterior scaffolding. The Sun Iron Building, designed by R.C. Hatfield in 1851, was the city's first iron-front building and was a model for a whole generation of downtown buildings. Brown Memorial Presbyterian Church, built in 1870 in memory of financier George Brown, has stained glass windows by Louis Comfort Tiffany and has been called "one of the most significant buildings in this city, a treasure of art and architecture" by Baltimore magazine.

The 1845 Greek Revival-style Lloyd Street Synagogue is one of the oldest synagogues in the United States. The Johns Hopkins Hospital, designed by Lt. Col. John S. Billings in 1876, was a considerable achievement for its day in functional arrangement and fireproofing.

I. M. Pei's World Trade Center (1977) is the tallest equilateral pentagonal building in the world at 405 feet (123 m) tall.

The streets of Baltimore are organized in a grid and spoke pattern, lined with tens of thousands of rowhouses whose mix of brick and formstone facings gives the city a distinct look; the latter was a technology patented in 1937 by Albert Knight. John Waters characterized formstone as "the polyester of brick". Developers began building entire neighborhoods of rowhouses in the mid-1790s, and the form became the dominant house type of the city early in the 19th century.

Oriole Park at Camden Yards is a Major League Baseball park, which opened in 1992 and was built as a retro style baseball park. Along with the National Aquarium, Camden Yards have helped revive the Inner Harbor area from what once was an exclusively industrial district full of dilapidated warehouses into a bustling commercial district full of bars, restaurants, and retail establishments.

==== Neighborhoods ====
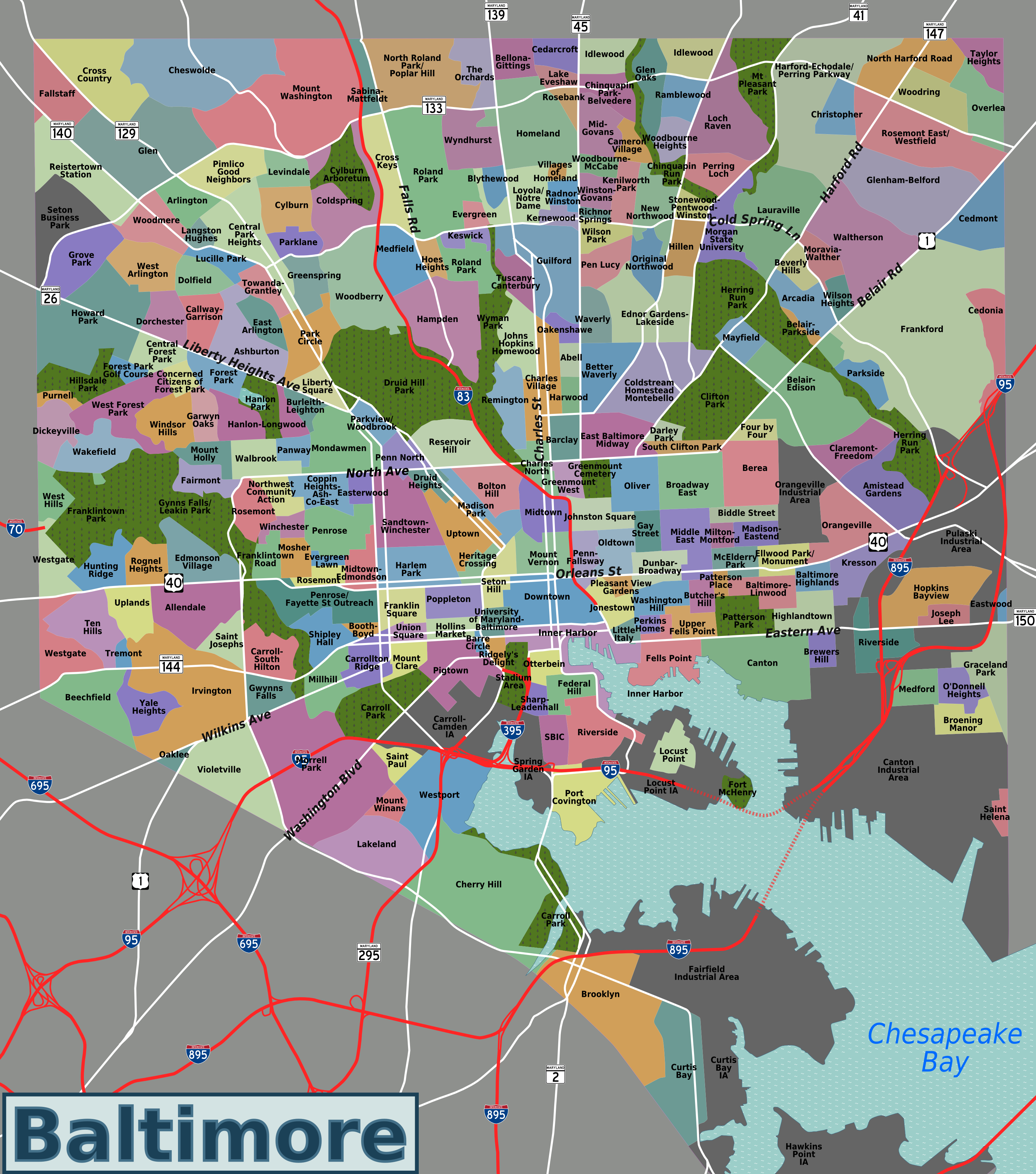
A map of Baltimore's designated neighborhoods

Baltimore is commonly divided into nine geographic regions: North, Northeast, East, Southeast, South, Southwest, West, Northwest, and Central, each corresponding to a Baltimore Police Department district. I-83 and Charles Street to Hanover Street and Ritchie Highway serve as a rough east–west dividing line, while Eastern Avenue to Route 40 serves as a north–south divider; for the U.S. Postal Service, Baltimore Street is the north–south dividing line.

Central Baltimore includes Downtown and the Inner Harbor, the city's main commercial district and home to Oriole Park at Camden Yards, M&T Bank Stadium, Harborplace, the Baltimore Convention Center, the National Aquarium, Maryland Science Center, the University of Maryland, Baltimore, the University of Maryland Medical Center, and Lexington Market. North Baltimore contains historic neighborhoods such as Govans, Roland Park, Guilford, Homeland, Hampden, Charles Village, and Mount Washington, as well as the Station North Arts and Entertainment District.

South Baltimore and Southeast Baltimore include mixed residential, industrial, and waterfront neighborhoods such as Federal Hill, Locust Point, Fells Point, Canton, Highlandtown, Little Italy, and Greektown. Landmarks in these areas include Fort McHenry, Patterson Park, the Highlandtown Arts District, and Johns Hopkins Bayview Medical Center.

Northeast Baltimore is largely residential and includes Morgan State University, Baltimore City College, the former site of Memorial Stadium, and Lake Montebello. East Baltimore includes Johns Hopkins Hospital, the Johns Hopkins University School of Medicine, and neighborhoods such as Armistead Gardens, Broadway East, Barclay, and McElderry Park.

Northwest Baltimore includes Pimlico Race Course, Sinai Hospital, the headquarters of the NAACP, and neighborhoods such as Pimlico, Mount Washington, Cheswolde, and Park Heights. West Baltimore includes the Old West Baltimore Historic District, historically a center of the city's Black community, as well as Coppin State University, Mondawmin Mall, and Edmondson Village. Southwest Baltimore includes Pigtown, Carrollton Ridge, Ridgely's Delight, Leakin Park, and St. Agnes Hospital.

=== Adjacent communities ===
Baltimore is bordered by the following communities, all unincorporated census-designated places.

- Arbutus
- Baltimore Highlands
- Brooklyn Park
- Catonsville
- Dundalk
- Glen Burnie
- Lansdowne
- Lochearn
- Nottingham
- Overlea
- Parkville
- Pasadena
- Pikesville
- Rosedale
- Towson
- Woodlawn

=== Climate ===
A climate chart for Baltimore

Baltimore has a humid subtropical (Köppen: Cfa) or oceanic (Trewartha: Doak) climate, with hot summers, cool winters, and a summer peak to annual precipitation. Baltimore is part of USDA plant hardiness zones 7b and 8a. Summers are hot and humid, with a daily average in July of 80.7 °F (27.1 °C) and occasional late-day thunderstorms. Spring and autumn are mild, with spring the wettest season by number of precipitation days. Winters range from chilly to mild, with sporadic snowfall: January has a daily average of 35.8 °F (2.1 °C), though temperatures reach 50 °F (10 °C) quite often and can occasionally drop below 20 °F (−7 °C) when Arctic air masses affect the area. According to Vox, winters are warming faster than summers. A southeasterly bay breeze off the Chesapeake often occurs on summer afternoons; interacting with prevailing southwesterly winds and the city's urban heat island, it can exacerbate air quality. In late summer and early autumn, hurricanes or their remnants may cause flooding in downtown Baltimore, despite the city being far removed from the typical coastal storm surge areas.

The average seasonal snowfall is 19 inches (48 cm). It varies greatly by year, with some seasons seeing only trace accumulations of snow, while others see several major Nor'easters. (Note: Officially, seasonal snowfall accumulation has ranged from 0.7 in (1.8 cm) in 1949–50 to 77.0 in (196 cm) in 2009–10. See North American blizzard of 2009#Snowfall (December 19–20, 2009), February 5–6, 2010 North American blizzard#Snowfall, and February 9–10, 2010 North American blizzard#Impact. The February storms contributed to a monthly accumulation of 50.0 in (127 cm), the most for any month. If no snow fell outside of February that winter, 2009–10 would still rank as 5th snowiest.) Owing to lessened urban heat island (UHI) as compared to the city proper and distance from the moderating Chesapeake Bay, the outlying and inland parts of the Baltimore metro area are usually cooler, especially at night, than the city proper and the coastal towns. Thus, in the northern and western suburbs, winter snowfall is more significant, and some areas average more than 30 in (76 cm) of snow per winter.

It is common in winter for the rain-snow line to set up in the metro area, and freezing rain and sleet occur a few times some winters.

Like all of Maryland, Baltimore is at risk for increased impacts of climate change. Historically, flooding has ruined houses and almost killed people, especially in lower income majority Black neighborhoods, and caused sewage backups, given the existing disrepair of Baltimore's water system.

Extreme temperatures have ranged from −7 °F (−22 °C), most recently on January 22, 1984, up to 108 °F (42 °C) on July 22, 2011. On average, temperatures of 100 °F (38 °C) or more occur on three days annually, 90 °F (32 °C) or more on 43 days, and there are nine days where the high fails to reach the freezing mark.

Climate data for Baltimore (Baltimore/Washington International Airport) 1991−2020 normals, (Note: Mean monthly maxima and minima (i.e. the expected highest and lowest temperature readings at any point during the year or given month) calculated based on data at said location from 1991 to 2020.) extremes 1872–present (Note: For more information, see ThreadEx))
Month	Jan	Feb	Mar	Apr	May	Jun	Jul	Aug	Sep	Oct	Nov	Dec	Year
Record high °F (°C)	79 (26)	83 (28)	90 (32)	94 (34)	98 (37)	105 (41)	107 (42)	105 (41)	101 (38)	98 (37)	86 (30)	77 (25)	107 (42)
Mean maximum °F (°C)	64.6 (18.1)	66.4 (19.1)	75.9 (24.4)	85.8 (29.9)	91.0 (32.8)	95.9 (35.5)	98.0 (36.7)	95.9 (35.5)	91.1 (32.8)	83.8 (28.8)	74.3 (23.5)	66.0 (18.9)	98.9 (37.2)
Mean daily maximum °F (°C)	43.2 (6.2)	46.4 (8.0)	54.8 (12.7)	66.5 (19.2)	75.5 (24.2)	84.4 (29.1)	88.8 (31.6)	86.5 (30.3)	79.7 (26.5)	68.3 (20.2)	57.3 (14.1)	47.5 (8.6)	66.6 (19.2)
Daily mean °F (°C)	34.3 (1.3)	36.6 (2.6)	44.3 (6.8)	55.0 (12.8)	64.4 (18.0)	73.5 (23.1)	78.3 (25.7)	76.2 (24.6)	69.2 (20.7)	57.4 (14.1)	46.9 (8.3)	38.6 (3.7)	56.2 (13.4)
Mean daily minimum °F (°C)	25.4 (−3.7)	26.9 (−2.8)	33.9 (1.1)	43.6 (6.4)	53.3 (11.8)	62.6 (17.0)	67.7 (19.8)	65.8 (18.8)	58.8 (14.9)	46.5 (8.1)	36.5 (2.5)	29.6 (−1.3)	45.9 (7.7)
Mean minimum °F (°C)	9.1 (−12.7)	12.2 (−11.0)	18.9 (−7.3)	29.7 (−1.3)	38.8 (3.8)	49.3 (9.6)	57.9 (14.4)	55.8 (13.2)	45.1 (7.3)	32.8 (0.4)	22.9 (−5.1)	15.6 (−9.1)	6.9 (−13.9)
Record low °F (°C)	−7 (−22)	−7 (−22)	4 (−16)	15 (−9)	32 (0)	40 (4)	50 (10)	45 (7)	35 (2)	25 (−4)	12 (−11)	−3 (−19)	−7 (−22)
Average precipitation inches (mm)	3.08 (78)	2.90 (74)	4.01 (102)	3.39 (86)	3.85 (98)	3.98 (101)	4.48 (114)	4.09 (104)	4.44 (113)	3.94 (100)	3.13 (80)	3.71 (94)	45.00 (1,143)
Average snowfall inches (cm)	6.4 (16)	7.5 (19)	2.8 (7.1)	0.0 (0.0)	0.0 (0.0)	0.0 (0.0)	0.0 (0.0)	0.0 (0.0)	0.0 (0.0)	0.0 (0.0)	0.1 (0.25)	2.5 (6.4)	19.3 (49)
Average precipitation days (≥ 0.01 in)	10.1	9.3	11.0	11.2	11.9	11.3	10.4	9.6	9.1	8.6	8.5	10.3	121.3
Average snowy days (≥ 0.1 in)	2.8	2.9	1.5	0.1	0.0	0.0	0.0	0.0	0.0	0.0	0.2	1.5	9.0
Average relative humidity (%)	63.2	61.3	59.2	58.9	66.1	68.4	69.1	71.1	71.3	69.5	66.5	65.5	65.8
Average dew point °F (°C)	19.9 (−6.7)	21.6 (−5.8)	28.9 (−1.7)	37.6 (3.1)	50.4 (10.2)	60.1 (15.6)	64.6 (18.1)	64.0 (17.8)	57.6 (14.2)	45.5 (7.5)	35.2 (1.8)	25.3 (−3.7)	42.6 (5.9)
Mean monthly sunshine hours	155.4	164.0	215.0	230.7	254.5	277.3	290.1	264.4	221.8	205.5	158.5	144.5	2,581.7
Percentage possible sunshine	51	54	58	58	57	62	64	62	59	59	52	49	58
Source: NOAA (relative humidity, dew points and sun 1961–1990)

Climate data for Baltimore (Maryland Science Center) 1991−2020 normals, extremes 1950–present
Month	Jan	Feb	Mar	Apr	May	Jun	Jul	Aug	Sep	Oct	Nov	Dec	Year
Record high °F (°C)	77 (25)	84 (29)	97 (36)	98 (37)	100 (38)	106 (41)	108 (42)	106 (41)	102 (39)	95 (35)	87 (31)	85 (29)	108 (42)
Mean maximum °F (°C)	65.0 (18.3)	66.5 (19.2)	77.0 (25.0)	87.7 (30.9)	92.5 (33.6)	97.3 (36.3)	99.7 (37.6)	97.8 (36.6)	92.9 (33.8)	85.4 (29.7)	75.4 (24.1)	67.1 (19.5)	100.9 (38.3)
Mean daily maximum °F (°C)	43.7 (6.5)	46.8 (8.2)	55.2 (12.9)	66.8 (19.3)	75.9 (24.4)	85.4 (29.7)	90.1 (32.3)	87.3 (30.7)	80.4 (26.9)	68.8 (20.4)	57.6 (14.2)	48.0 (8.9)	67.2 (19.6)
Daily mean °F (°C)	36.9 (2.7)	39.4 (4.1)	46.9 (8.3)	57.5 (14.2)	67.0 (19.4)	76.6 (24.8)	81.5 (27.5)	79.1 (26.2)	72.5 (22.5)	60.7 (15.9)	50.1 (10.1)	41.3 (5.2)	59.1 (15.1)
Mean daily minimum °F (°C)	30.0 (−1.1)	31.9 (−0.1)	38.7 (3.7)	48.2 (9.0)	58.0 (14.4)	67.7 (19.8)	72.9 (22.7)	71.0 (21.7)	64.5 (18.1)	52.6 (11.4)	42.6 (5.9)	34.6 (1.4)	51.1 (10.6)
Mean minimum °F (°C)	14.7 (−9.6)	17.3 (−8.2)	23.9 (−4.5)	36.2 (2.3)	46.9 (8.3)	57.5 (14.2)	65.6 (18.7)	63.2 (17.3)	53.4 (11.9)	40.3 (4.6)	29.9 (−1.2)	22.2 (−5.4)	12.5 (−10.8)
Record low °F (°C)	−4 (−20)	−3 (−19)	12 (−11)	21 (−6)	36 (2)	48 (9)	58 (14)	52 (11)	40 (4)	30 (−1)	16 (−9)	6 (−14)	−4 (−20)
Average precipitation inches (mm)	3.07 (78)	2.75 (70)	3.93 (100)	3.55 (90)	3.39 (86)	3.36 (85)	4.71 (120)	4.35 (110)	4.49 (114)	3.49 (89)	2.98 (76)	3.66 (93)	43.73 (1,111)
Average precipitation days (≥ 0.01 in)	9.9	9.7	10.7	11.0	11.3	10.7	10.6	9.5	8.5	8.5	8.1	10.2	118.7
Source: NOAA

Climate data for Baltimore
Month	Jan	Feb	Mar	Apr	May	Jun	Jul	Aug	Sep	Oct	Nov	Dec	Year
Average sea temperature °F (°C)	46.0 (7.8)	44.4 (6.9)	45.1 (7.3)	50.4 (10.2)	55.9 (13.3)	68.2 (20.1)	75.6 (24.2)	77.4 (25.2)	73.4 (23.0)	66.0 (18.9)	57.2 (14.0)	50.7 (10.4)	59.2 (15.1)
Mean daily daylight hours	10.0	11.0	12.0	13.0	14.0	15.0	15.0	14.0	12.0	11.0	10.0	9.0	12.2
Source: Weather Atlas

== Demographics ==
=== Population ===
Historical population
Year	Pop.	±%
1752	200	—
1775	5,934	+2867.0%
1790	13,503	+127.6%
1800	26,514	+96.4%
1810	46,555	+75.6%
1820	62,738	+34.8%
1830	80,620	+28.5%
1840	102,313	+26.9%
1850	169,054	+65.2%
1860	212,418	+25.7%
1870	267,354	+25.9%
1880	332,313	+24.3%
1890	434,439	+30.7%
1900	508,957	+17.2%
1910	558,485	+9.7%
1920	733,826	+31.4%
1930	804,874	+9.7%
1940	859,100	+6.7%
1950	949,708	+10.5%
1960	939,024	−1.1%
1970	905,787	−3.5%
1980	786,741	−13.1%
1990	736,016	−6.4%
2000	651,154	−11.5%
2010	620,961	−4.6%
2020	585,708	−5.7%
2025 est.	569,997	−2.7%
U.S. Decennial Census; 1790–1960 1900–1990; 1990–2000 2010–2020; 1752 estimate & 1775 census

Baltimore reached a peak population of 949,708 at the 1950 U.S. census count. In every ten-year census count since then, the city has lost population, with its 2020 census population at 585,708.

Baltimore is the most populous independent city in the United States. Baltimore City's population declined from 620,961 in 2010 to 585,708 in 2020, representing a 5.7% drop. In 2020, Baltimore lost more population than any other major city in the United States. The population increased for the first time in decades in 2024.

Gentrification has increased since the 2000 census, primarily in East Baltimore, downtown, and Central Baltimore, with 14.8% of census tracts having had income growth and home values appreciation at a rate higher than the city overall. Many, but not all, gentrifying neighborhoods are predominantly white areas which have seen a turnover from lower income to higher income households. These areas represent either expansion of existing gentrified areas, or activity around the Inner Harbor, downtown, or the Johns Hopkins Homewood campus. In some neighborhoods in East Baltimore, the Hispanic population has increased, while both the non-Hispanic white and non-Hispanic black populations have declined.

After New York City, Baltimore was the second city in the United States to reach a population of 100,000. It was the second most-populous U.S. city from 1820 to 1850, and remained among the ten largest in every census through 1980. After World War II, the city's population approached one million before beginning its decline after the 1950 census.

=== Characteristics ===
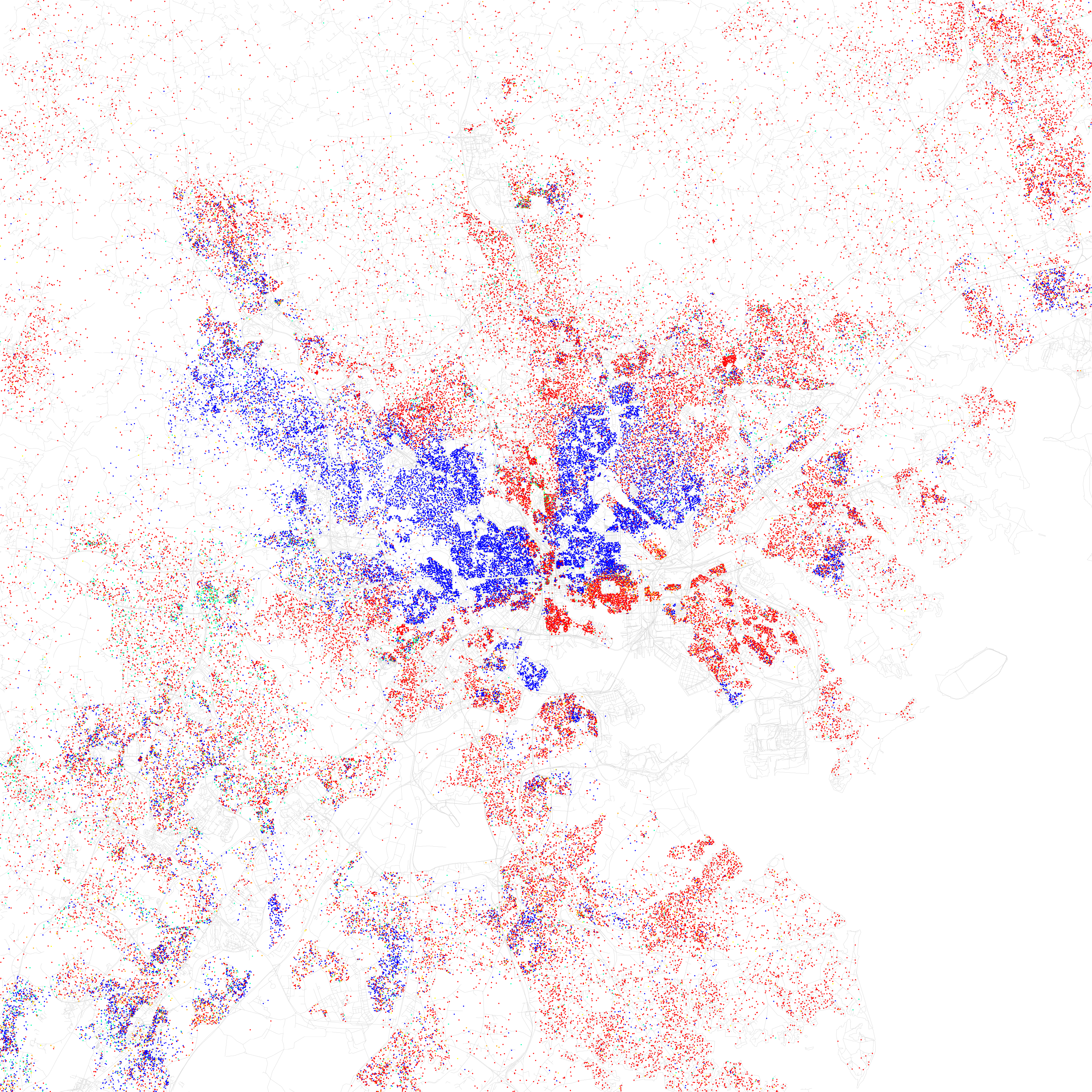
A racial distribution map of Baltimore, 2010 U.S. census. Each dot is 25 people: ⬤ White ⬤ Black ⬤ Asian ⬤ Hispanic ⬤ Other

Historical racial and ethnic profile	2020	2010	1990	1970	1940
White	31.9%	29.6%	39.1%	53.0%	80.6%
—Non-Hispanic whites	27.6%	28.0%	38.6%	52.3% (Note: From 15% sample)	80.6%
Black or African American (non-Hispanic)	62.4%	63.7%	59.2%	46.4%	19.3%
Hispanic or Latino (of any race)	6.0%	4.2%	1.0%	0.9%	0.1%
Asian	2.8%	2.3%	1.1%	0.3%	0.1%

Baltimore city, Maryland – Racial and ethnic composition Note: the US Census treats Hispanic/Latino as an ethnic category. This table excludes Latinos from the racial categories and assigns them to a separate category. Hispanics/Latinos may be of any race.
Race / Ethnicity (NH = Non-Hispanic)	Pop 1980	Pop 1990	Pop 2000	Pop 2010	Pop 2020	% 1980	% 1990	% 2000	% 2010	% 2020
White alone (NH)	341,699	284,187	201,566	174,120	157,296	43.43%	38.61%	30.96%	28.04%	26.86%
Black or African American alone (NH)	428,279	433,705	417,009	392,938	335,615	54.43%	58.93%	64.04%	63.28%	57.30%
Native American or Alaska Native alone (NH)	2,108	2,445	1,946	1,884	1,278	0.27%	0.33%	0.30%	0.30%	0.22%
Asian alone (NH)	4,949	7,689	9,824	14,397	21,020	0.63%	1.04%	1.51%	2.32%	3.59%
Native Hawaiian or Pacific Islander alone (NH)	x	x	193	192	152	x	x	0.03%	0.03%	0.03%
Other race alone (NH)	2,102	386	1,143	942	3,332	0.27%	0.05%	0.18%	0.15%	0.57%
Mixed race or Multiracial (NH)	x	x	8,412	10,528	21,088	x	x	1.29%	1.70%	3.60%
Hispanic or Latino (any race)	7,638	7,602	11,061	25,960	45,927	0.97%	1.03%	1.70%	4.18%	7.84%
Total	786,775	736,014	651,154	620,961	585,708	100.00%	100.00%	100.00%	100.00%	100.00%

In the 2010 census, Baltimore's population was 63.7% Black, 29.6% White (the largest ancestries being German, Italian, and Irish), 2.3% Asian, and 0.4% Native American and Alaska Native. Across races, 4.2% of the population were of Hispanic, Latino, or Spanish origin, most commonly Salvadoran and Mexican.

As per the 2020 census, 8.1% of residents between 2016 and 2020 were foreign born persons. Females made up 53.4% of the population. The median age was 35 years old, with 22.4% under 18 years old, 65.8% from 18 to 64 years old, and 11.8% 65 or older.

Baltimore has a large Caribbean American population, with the largest groups being Jamaicans and Trinidadians. Baltimore's Jamaican community is largely centered in the Park Heights neighborhood, but generations of immigrants have also lived in Southeast Baltimore.

In 2005, approximately 30,778 people (6.5%) identified as gay, lesbian, or bisexual. In 2012, same-sex marriage in Maryland was legalized, going into effect January 1, 2013.

=== Income and housing ===
Between 2016 and 2020, the median household income was $52,164 and the median income per capita was $32,699, compared to the national averages of $64,994 and $35,384, respectively. In 2009, the median household income was $42,241 and the median income per capita was $25,707, compared to the national median income of $53,889 per household and $28,930 per capita.

In 2009, 23.7% of the population lived below the poverty line, compared to 13.5% nationwide. In the 2020 census, 20% of Baltimore residents were living in poverty, compared to 11.6% nationwide.

Housing in Baltimore is relatively inexpensive for large, near-coastal cities of its size. The median sale price for homes in Baltimore as of December 2022 was $209,000, up from $95,000 in 2012. Despite the late 2000s housing price collapse, and along with the national trends, Baltimore residents still faced slowly increasing rent, up 3% in the summer of 2010. The median value of owner-occupied housing units between 2016 and 2020 was $242,499.

The homeless population in Baltimore is steadily increasing. It exceeded 4,000 people in 2011. The increase in the number of young homeless people was particularly severe.

=== Life expectancy ===
In 2015, the life expectancy in Baltimore was 74 to 75 years, compared to the U.S. average of 78 to 80. Fourteen neighborhoods, concentrated in East, West, and South Baltimore, had lower life expectancies than North Korea, and the figure in Seton Hill was comparable to that of Yemen.

=== Religion ===
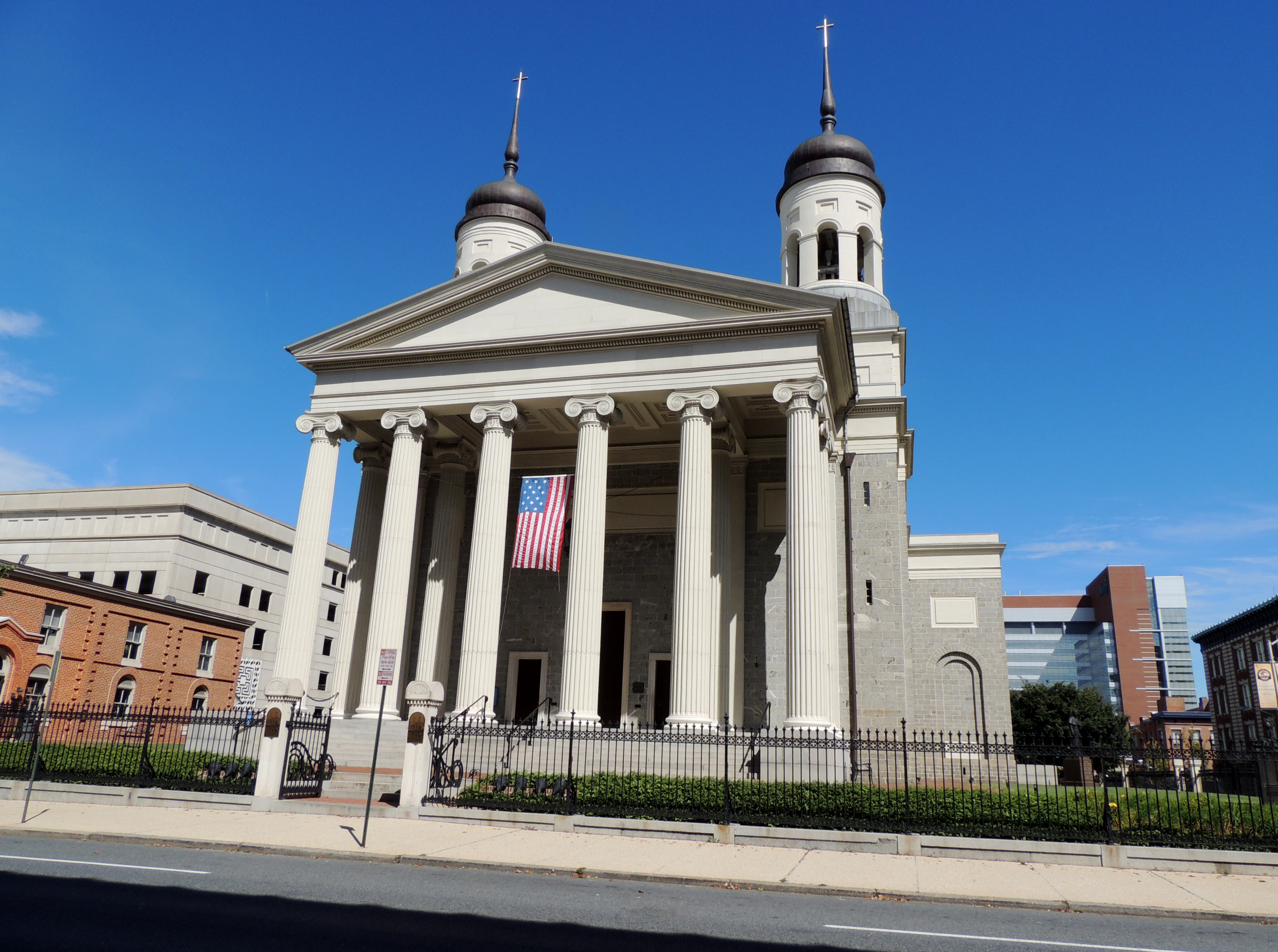
Baltimore Basilica, the first Catholic cathedral built in the United States

In 2015, 25% of adults in Baltimore reported affiliation with no religion. 50% of the adult population of Baltimore are Protestants. (Note: Including Evangelical Protestants (19%), Mainline Protestants (16%) and Historically Black Protestants (15%).) Catholicism is the second-largest religious affiliation, constituting 15% percent of the population, followed by Judaism (3%) and Islam (2%). Around 1% identify with other Christian denominations.

=== Languages ===
In 2010, 91% (526,705) of Baltimore residents five years old and older spoke only English at home. Close to 4% (21,661) spoke Spanish. Other languages, such as African languages, French, and Chinese are spoken by less than 1% of the population.

== Economy ==
Once a predominantly industrial town, with an economic base focused on steel processing, shipping, auto manufacturing (General Motors Baltimore Assembly), and transportation, Baltimore experienced deindustrialization, which cost residents tens of thousands of low-skill, high-wage jobs. Baltimore now relies on a low-wage service economy, which accounts for 31% of jobs in the city. Around the turn of the 20th century, Baltimore was the leading U.S. manufacturer of rye whiskey and straw hats. It led in the refining of crude oil, brought to the city by pipeline from Pennsylvania.

In March 2018, Baltimore's unemployment rate was 5.8%. In 2012, one quarter of Baltimore residents, and 37% of Baltimore children, lived in poverty. Downtown Baltimore is the primary economic asset within the city and region, with 29.1 million square feet of office space, and its tech sector is growing: the metro ranked 8th in the 2015 CBRE Tech Talent Report among 50 U.S. metro areas, and in 2013 Forbes ranked Baltimore fourth among America's "new tech hot spots".

The city is home to the Johns Hopkins Hospital. Other large companies in Baltimore include Under Armour, BRT Laboratories, Cordish Company, Legg Mason, McCormick & Company, T. Rowe Price, and Royal Farms. A sugar refinery owned by American Sugar Refining is one of Baltimore's cultural icons. Nonprofits based in Baltimore include Lutheran Services in America, Catholic Relief Services and Jhpiego.

Almost a quarter of the jobs in the Baltimore region were in science, technology, engineering, and mathematics as of mid-2013, a fact attributed in part to the city's extensive undergraduate and graduate schools; maintenance and repair experts were included in this count.

=== Port ===
The center of international commerce for the region is the World Trade Center Baltimore, which houses the Maryland Port Administration and U.S. headquarters for major shipping lines. Among all U.S. ports, Baltimore is ranked 9th for total dollar value of cargo and 13th for cargo tonnage. In 2014, cargo moving through the port totaled 29.5 million tons valued at $52.5 billion. The Port of Baltimore generates $3 billion in annual wages and salary, supports 14,630 direct jobs and 108,000 jobs connected to port work, and in 2014 generated more than $300 million in taxes.

The port serves over 50 ocean carriers, making nearly 1,800 annual visits. Among all U.S. ports, Baltimore is first in handling automobiles, light trucks, farm and construction machinery; and imported forest products, aluminum, and sugar. The port is second in coal exports. The Port of Baltimore's cruise industry, which offers year-round trips on several lines, supports over 400 jobs and brings in over $63 million to Maryland's economy annually.

=== Tourism ===
Baltimore's history and attractions have made it a popular tourist destination. In 2014, the city hosted 24.5 million visitors, who spent $5.2 billion. Much of the city's tourism centers around the Inner Harbor, with the National Aquarium being Maryland's top tourist destination. Baltimore Harbor's restoration has made it "a city of boats", with several historic ships maintained by the Historic Ships in Baltimore organization and open to the public. These include the USS Constellation, the last Civil War-era vessel afloat; the submarine USS Torsk; the Coast Guard cutter WHEC-37, which was at Pearl Harbor during the 1941 attack; the lightship Chesapeake; and the Seven Foot Knoll Lighthouse, the oldest surviving screw-pile lighthouse on Chesapeake Bay. The Inner Harbor is also the home port of Pride of Baltimore II, the state's "goodwill ambassador" ship and a reconstruction of a famous Baltimore Clipper.

Other tourist destinations include sporting venues such as Oriole Park at Camden Yards, M&T Bank Stadium, and Pimlico Race Course, Fort McHenry, the Mount Vernon, Federal Hill, and Fells Point neighborhoods, Lexington Market, Horseshoe Casino, and museums such as the Walters Art Museum, the Baltimore Museum of Industry, the Babe Ruth Birthplace and Museum, the Maryland Science Center, and the B&O Railroad Museum.

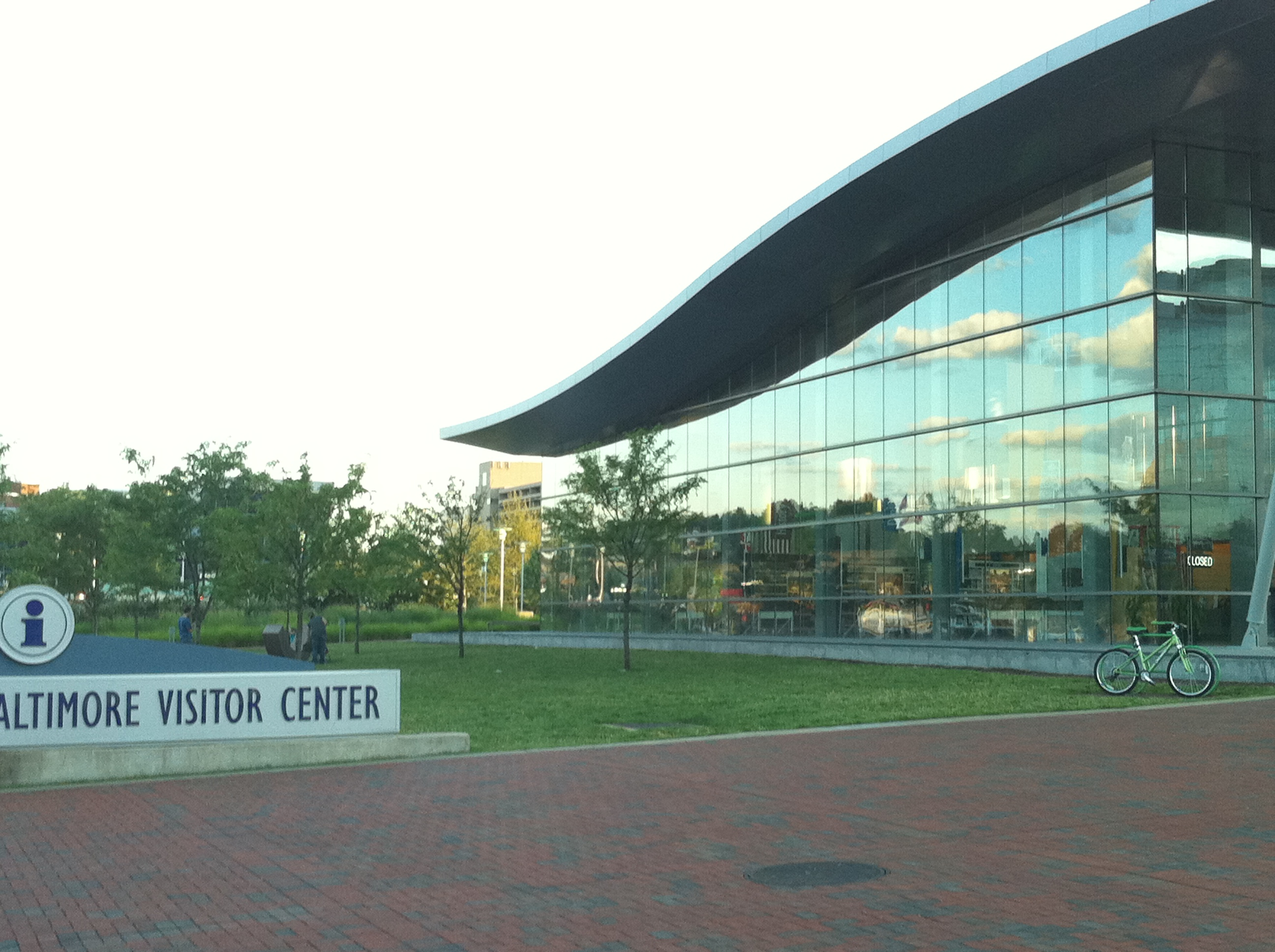
The Baltimore Visitor Center at the Inner Harbor

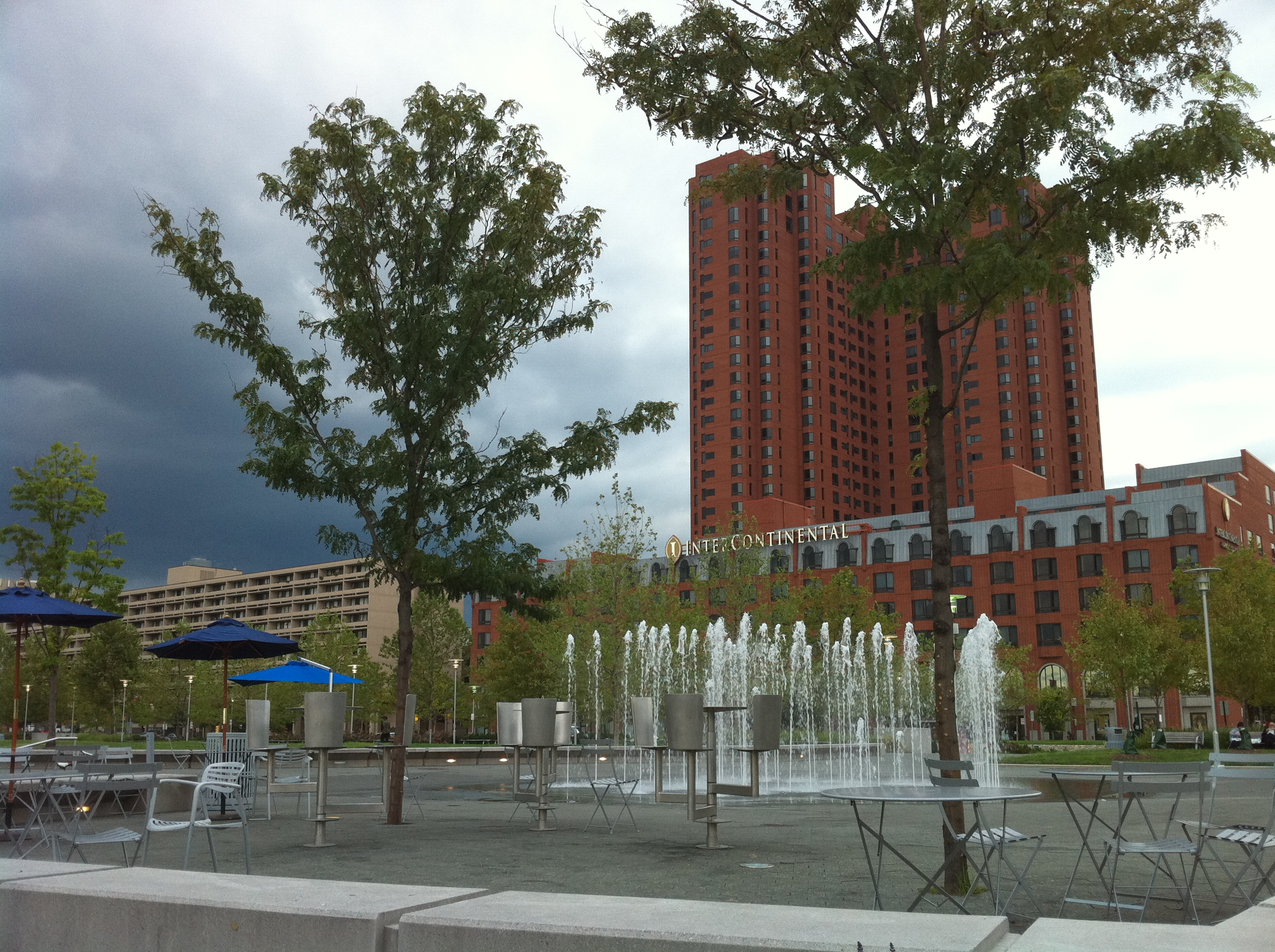
Fountain near visitor center in Inner Harbor

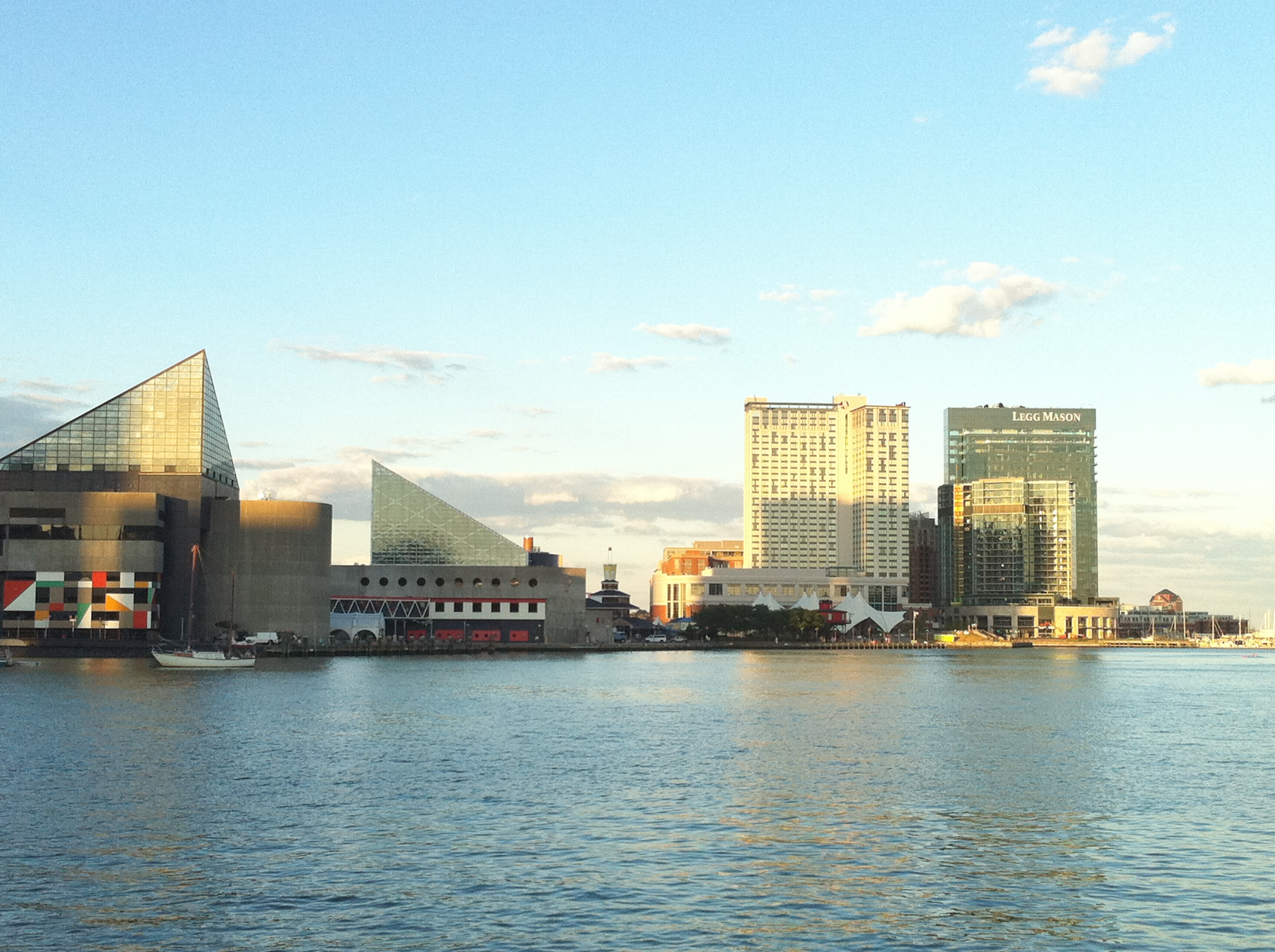
Sunset at Inner Harbor

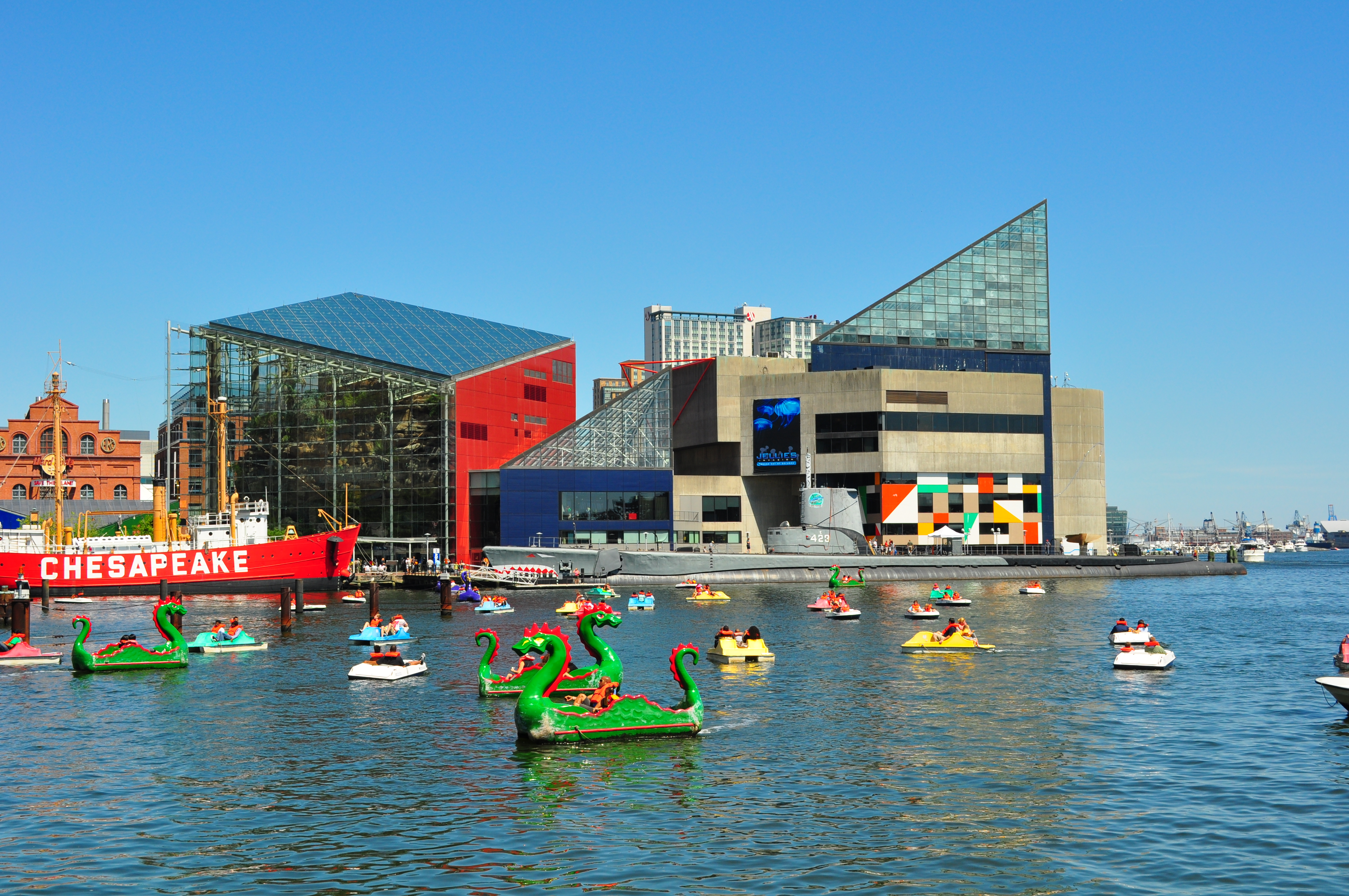
Baltimore is the home of the National Aquarium, one of the world's largest aquariums.

== Culture ==
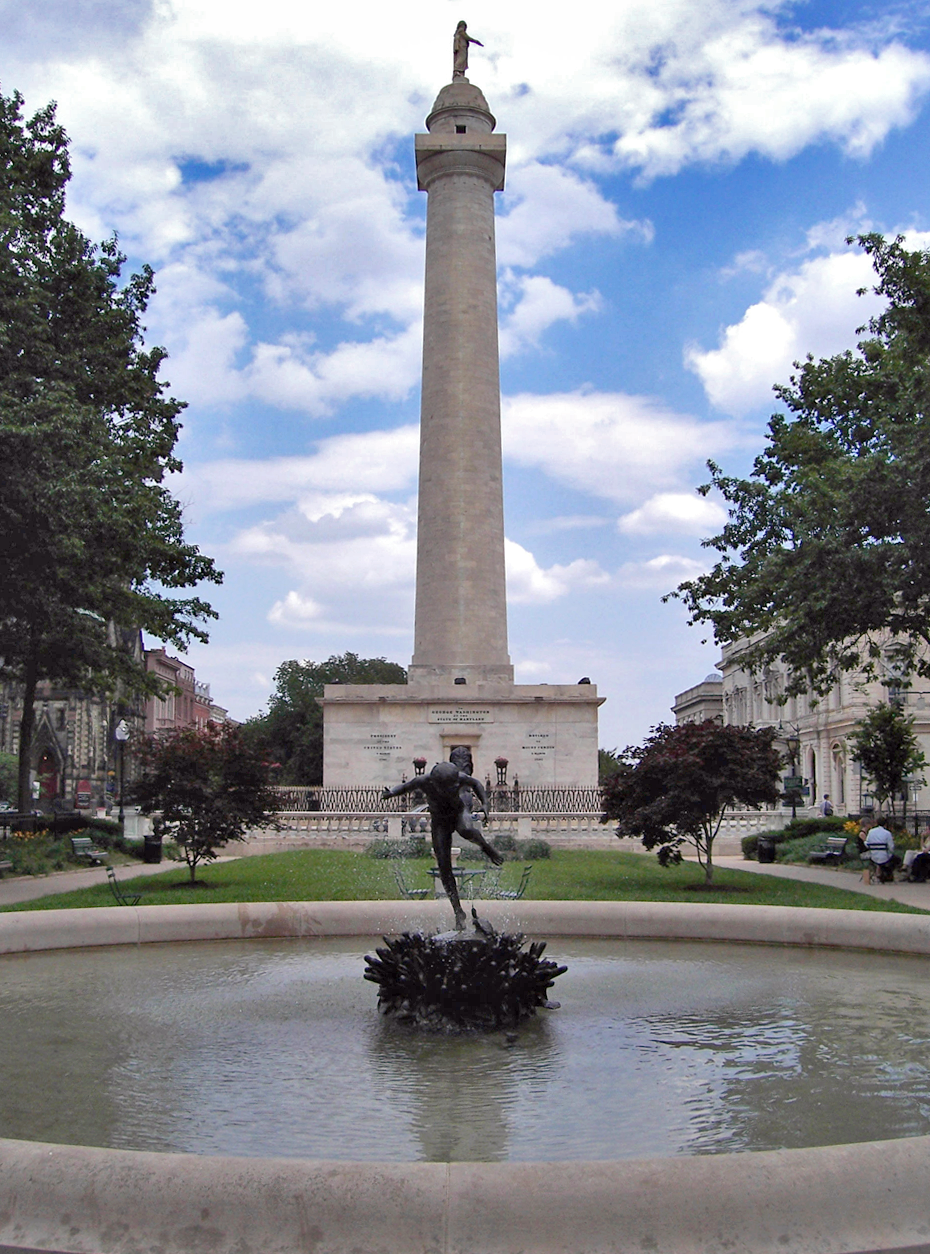
The Washington Monument, erected in 1815 in Baltimore in honor of George Washington

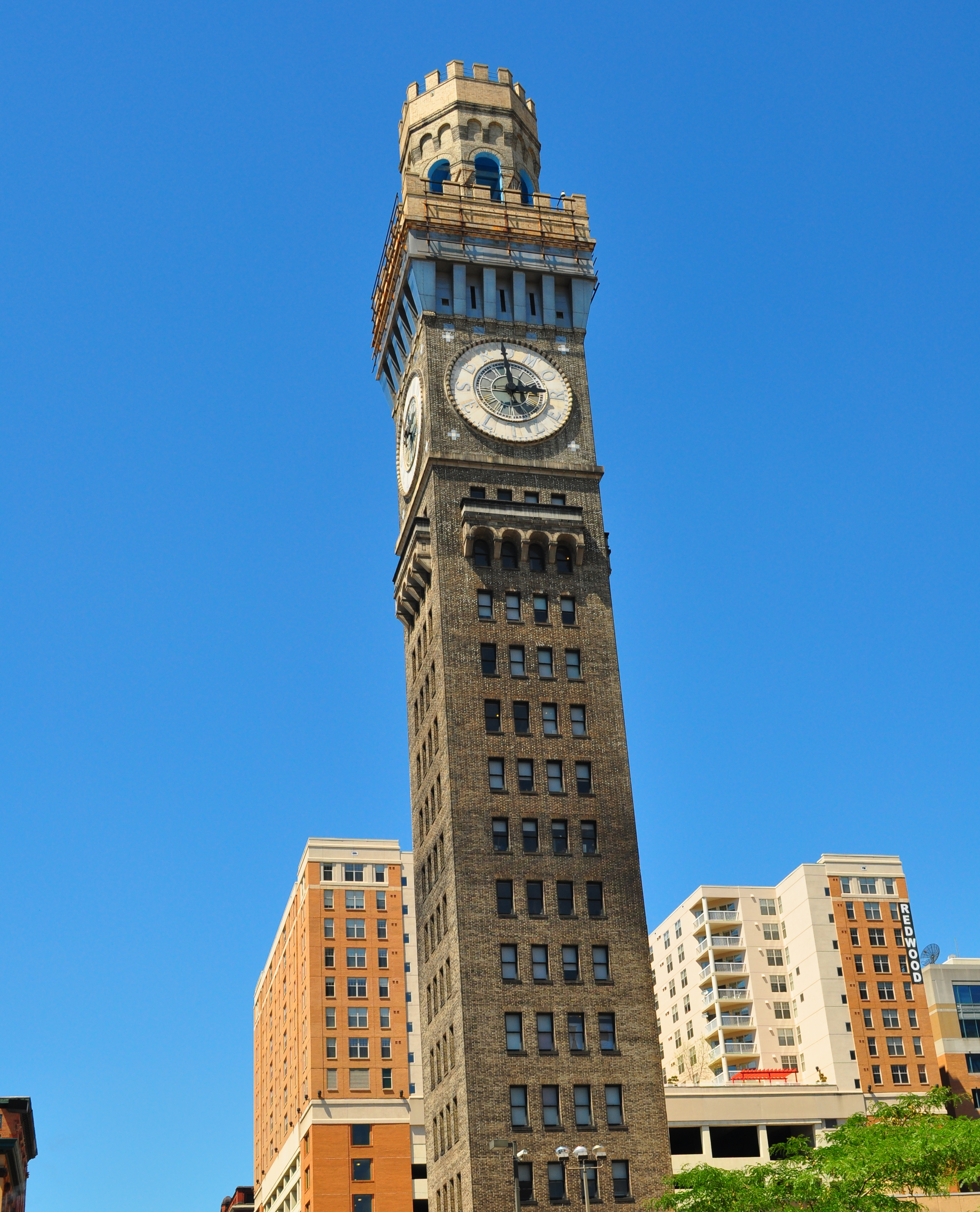
Emerson Bromo-Seltzer Tower, built in 1911, includes 15 stories that have been transformed into studio spaces for visual and literary artists.

Baltimore has historically been a working-class port town, sometimes dubbed a "city of neighborhoods". It comprises 72 designated historic districts, traditionally occupied by distinct ethnic groups. Most notable today are three downtown areas along the port: the Inner Harbor, frequented by tourists because of its hotels, shops, and museums; Fells Point, once a favorite entertainment spot for sailors but now refurbished and gentrified (and featured in the movie Sleepless in Seattle); and Little Italy, which is located between the other two and is where Baltimore's Italian-American community is based.

Further inland, Mount Vernon is the traditional center of cultural and artistic life of the city. It is home to a distinctive Washington Monument, set atop a hill in a 19th-century urban square that predates the monument in Washington, D.C., by several decades. Baltimore has a significant German American population and was the second-largest port of immigration to the United States, behind Ellis Island in New York and New Jersey.

From 1820 to 1989, almost 2 million migrants—among them German, Polish, English, Irish, Russian, Lithuanian, Greek, and Italian—came to Baltimore, mostly from 1861 to 1930. By 1913, the city was averaging 40,000 immigrants per year, until World War I closed off the flow. A Chinatown dating to at least the 1880s once held some 400 Chinese residents; a local Chinese American association remains based there.

Beer-making thrived in Baltimore from the 1800s to the 1950s, with over 100 breweries in the city's past. The best remaining examples are the old American Brewery Building on North Gay Street and the National Brewing Company building in Brewer's Hill. In the 1940s, the National Brewing Company introduced the nation's first six-pack; its two most prominent brands were National Bohemian Beer (colloquially "Natty Boh") and Colt 45. Both are still made today, albeit outside Maryland, and remain local staples whose "Natty Boh" mascot appears on merchandise throughout the area.

Each year, Artscape takes place in the city in the Bolton Hill neighborhood, close to Maryland Institute College of Art. Artscape styles itself as the "largest free arts festival in America". Each May, the Maryland Film Festival takes place in Baltimore, using all five screens of the historic Charles Theatre as its anchor venue. Many movies and television shows have been filmed in Baltimore. Homicide: Life on the Street was set and filmed in Baltimore, as was The Wire. House of Cards and Veep are set in Washington, D.C., but filmed in Baltimore.

Baltimore has cultural museums in many areas of study. The Baltimore Museum of Art and the Walters Art Museum are internationally renowned for their collections of art. The Baltimore Museum of Art has the world's largest holding of works by Henri Matisse. The American Visionary Art Museum has been designated by Congress as America's national museum for visionary art. The National Great Blacks in Wax Museum is the first African American wax museum in the country, featuring more than 150 life-size and lifelike wax figures.

=== Cuisine ===
Baltimore is known for its Maryland blue crabs, crab cake, Old Bay Seasoning, pit beef, and the "chicken box" (chicken wings with french fries). The city has many restaurants in or around the Inner Harbor, with Little Italy and Fells Point—home to the oldest U.S. continuously running tavern, "The Horse You Came In On Saloon"—drawing tourists and locals alike.

The Baltimore Public Market System is the oldest continuously operating public market system in the United States, and Lexington Market, dating to 1782, is among the longest running in the world. Baltimore is also the last place in America with arabbers—vendors who sell produce from horse-drawn carts. In 2015, Zagat ranked Baltimore second on a list of the 17 best food cities in the United States.

=== Local dialect ===
Baltimore city, along with its surrounding regions, is home to a unique local dialect known as the Baltimore dialect. It is part of the larger Mid-Atlantic American English group and is noted to be very similar to the Philadelphia dialect.

The so-called Bawlmerese (named so for how locals often pronounce the city as "Bawlmore") accent is known for its characteristic pronunciation of its long "o" vowel, in which an "eh" sound is added before the long "o" sound (/oʊ/ shifts to [ɘʊ], or even [eʊ]). It adopts Philadelphia's pattern of the short "a" sound, such that the tensed vowel in words like "bath" or "ask" does not match the more relaxed one in "sad" or "act".

Baltimore native John Waters parodies the city and its dialect extensively in his films. Most are filmed in Baltimore, including the 1972 cult classic Pink Flamingos, as were Hairspray and its Broadway musical remake.

=== Performing arts ===
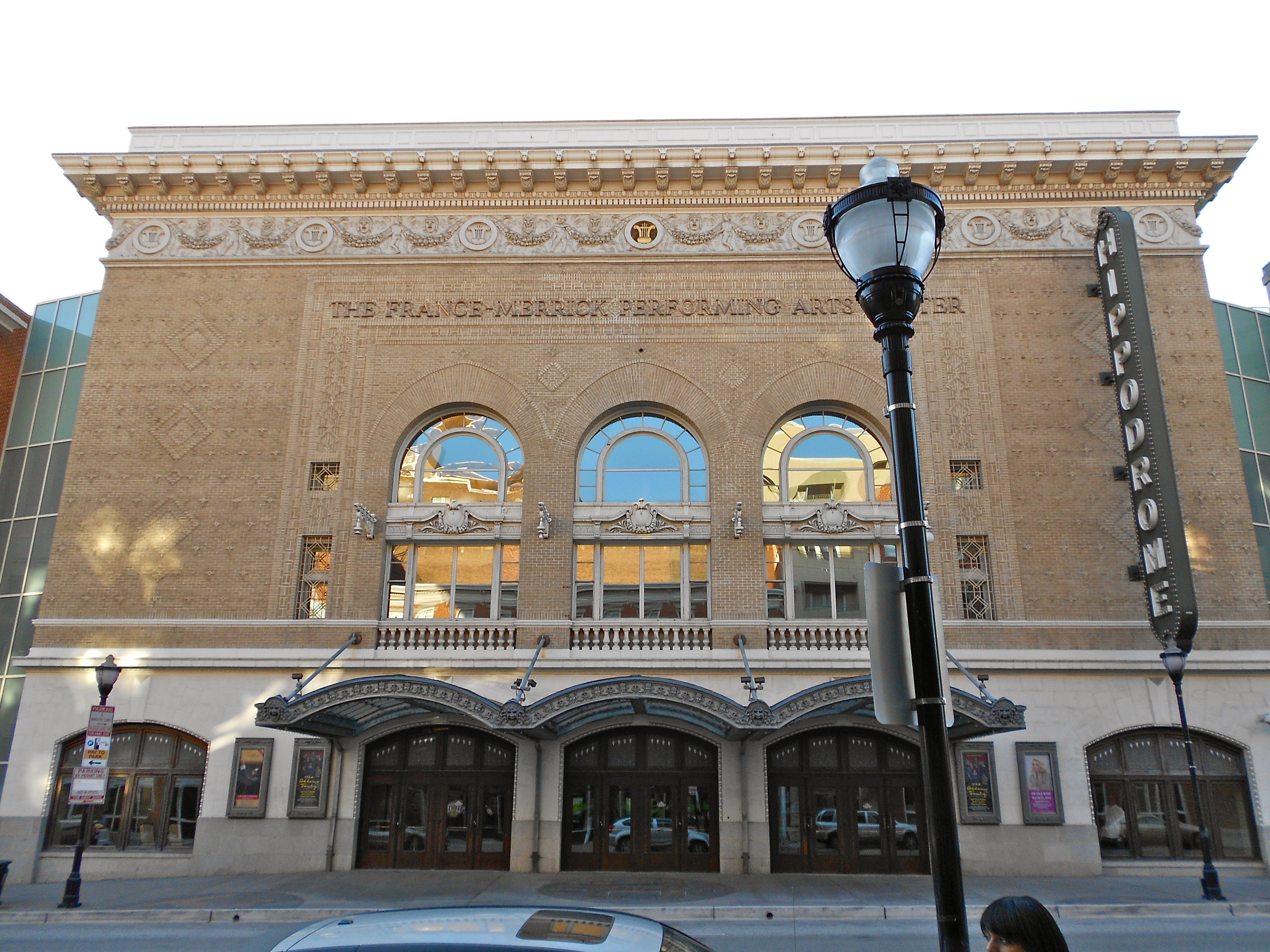
The Hippodrome Theatre

Baltimore has four state-designated arts and entertainment districts: The Pennsylvania Avenue Black Arts and Entertainment District, Station North Arts and Entertainment District, Highlandtown Arts District, and Bromo Arts & Entertainment District.

The Baltimore Office of Promotion and the Arts (BOPA), the official city arts council, produces arts programs, manages several facilities, and coordinates major events such as the Inner Harbor's New Year's Eve and July 4 celebrations, Artscape, the Baltimore Book Festival, and the Dr. Martin Luther King Jr. Parade.

The Baltimore Symphony Orchestra is internationally renowned, founded in 1916 as a publicly funded municipal organization. Its most recent music director was Marin Alsop, a protégé of Leonard Bernstein's. Centerstage is the premier theatre company in the city and a regionally well-respected group. The Lyric Opera House is the home of Lyric Opera Baltimore, which operates there as part of the Patricia and Arthur Modell Performing Arts Center. The Shriver Hall Concert Series, founded in 1966, presents classical chamber music and recitals featuring nationally and internationally recognized musical artists.

The Peabody Institute, located in the Mount Vernon neighborhood, is the oldest conservatory of music in the United States. Established in 1857, it is also one of the most prestigious in the world, along with Juilliard, Eastman, and the Curtis Institute. The Morgan State University Choir is one of the nation's most prestigious university choral ensembles. Baltimore is home to the Baltimore School for the Arts, a public high school in Mount Vernon nationally recognized for preparing students in music, theatre, dance, and visual arts.

In 1981, Baltimore hosted the first International Theater Festival, staging 66 performances of nine shows by international theatre companies; the event proved expensive and moved to Denver the following year. In June 1986, the 20th Theatre of Nations, sponsored by the International Theatre Institute, was held in Baltimore, the first time it had taken place in the U.S.

== Sports ==
=== Baseball ===
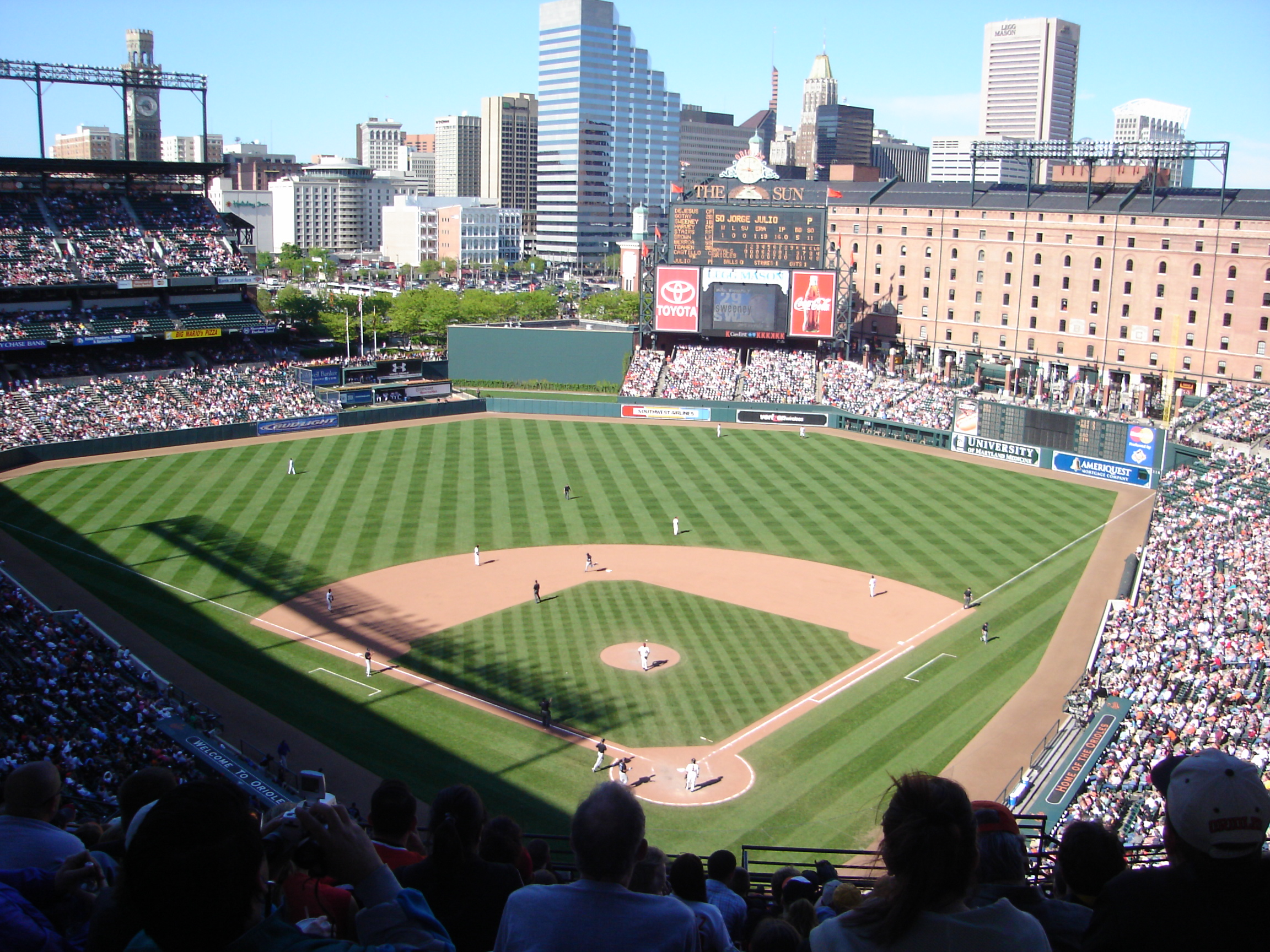
Oriole Park at Camden Yards, home to the Baltimore Orioles of Major League Baseball

Baltimore has a long and storied baseball history, including its distinction as the birthplace of Babe Ruth in 1895. The original 19th-century Baltimore Orioles (1882–1899) were among the most successful early franchises. A short-lived American League Orioles played in 1901–1902 before moving to New York and becoming the New York Yankees, while Ruth played for the minor-league Orioles, who competed locally until 1953.

The team currently known as the Baltimore Orioles has represented Major League Baseball locally since 1954 when the St. Louis Browns moved to Baltimore. The Orioles advanced to the World Series in 1966, 1969, 1970, 1971, 1979 and 1983, winning three times (1966, 1970 and 1983), while making the playoffs all but one year (1972) from 1969 through 1974.

In 1995, local player (and later Hall of Famer) Cal Ripken Jr. broke Lou Gehrig's streak of 2,130 consecutive games played, for which Ripken was named Sportsman of the Year by Sports Illustrated magazine. Six former Orioles players, including Ripken (2007), and two of the team's managers have been inducted into the Baseball Hall of Fame.

Since 1992, the Orioles' home ballpark has been Oriole Park at Camden Yards, which has been hailed as one of the league's best since it opened.

=== Football ===
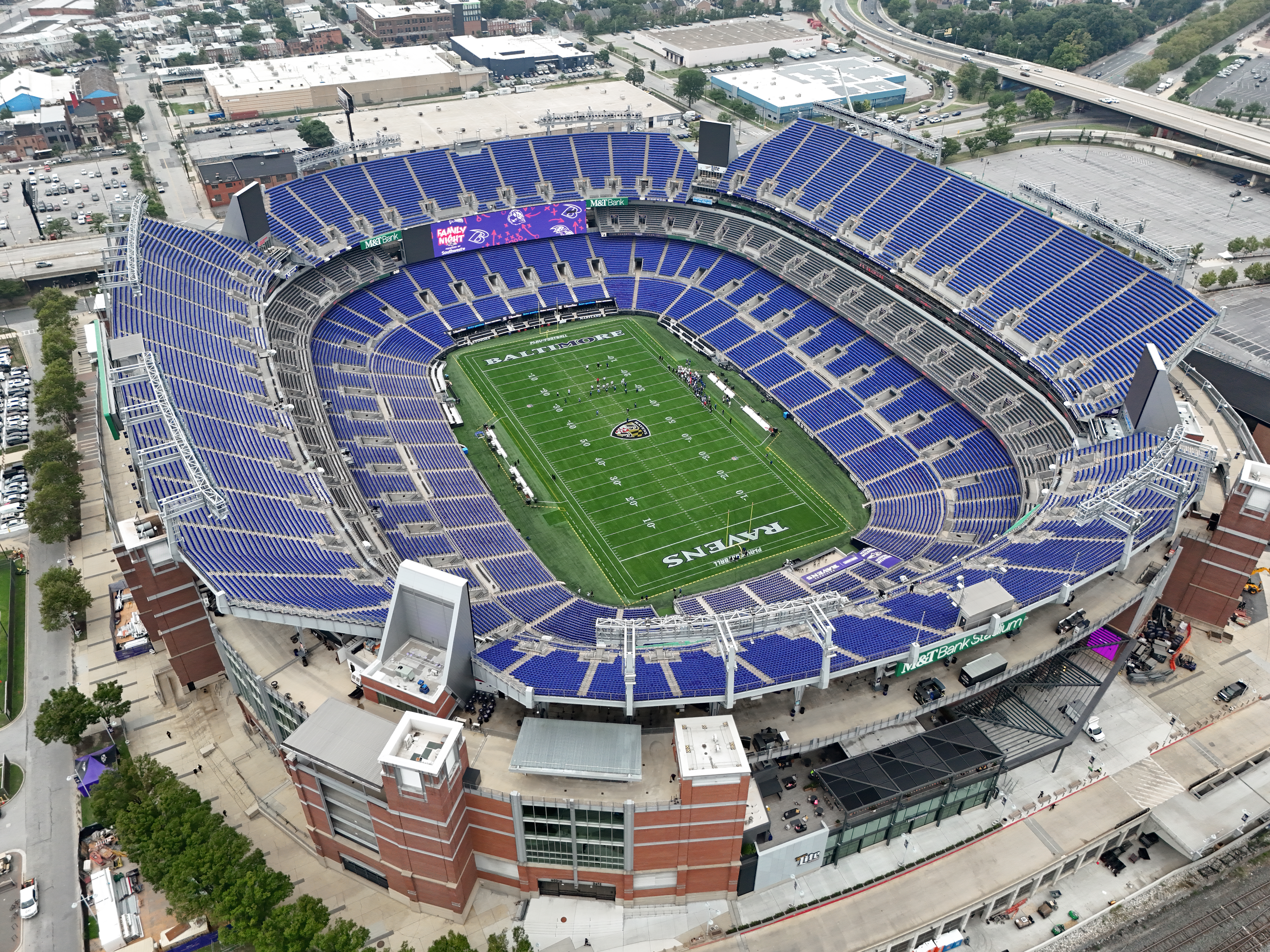
M&T Bank Stadium, home to the Baltimore Ravens of the National Football League

Before the 1950s, several attempts at a professional football team in Baltimore were blocked by the Washington franchise and its NFL allies. The first major-league team in the city was the All-America Football Conference (AAFC) Baltimore Colts, which played from 1947 to 1949, joined the NFL for a single year (1950), and then went bankrupt.

In 1953, the NFL's Dallas Texans folded. Its assets and player contracts were purchased by an ownership team headed by Baltimore businessman Carroll Rosenbloom, who moved the team to Baltimore, establishing a new team also named the Baltimore Colts. During the 1950s and 1960s, the Colts were one of the NFLs more successful franchises, led by Pro Football Hall of Fame quarterback Johnny Unitas. The Colts advanced to the NFL Championship twice (1958 and 1959) and the Super Bowl twice (1969 and 1971), winning all except Super Bowl III in 1969. After the 1983 season, the team left Baltimore for Indianapolis in 1984, where they became the Indianapolis Colts.

The NFL returned to Baltimore when the former Cleveland Browns personnel moved to Baltimore and established the Baltimore Ravens in 1996. Since then, the Ravens won a Super Bowl championship in 2000 and 2012, eight AFC North division championships (2003, 2006, 2011, 2012, 2018, 2019, 2023, and 2024), and appeared in five AFC Championship Games (2000, 2008, 2011, 2012 and 2023).

Baltimore also hosted a Canadian Football League franchise, the Baltimore Stallions for the 1994 and 1995 seasons. Following the 1995 season, and ultimate end to the Canadian Football League in the United States experiment, the team was sold and relocated to Montreal.

=== Other teams and events ===
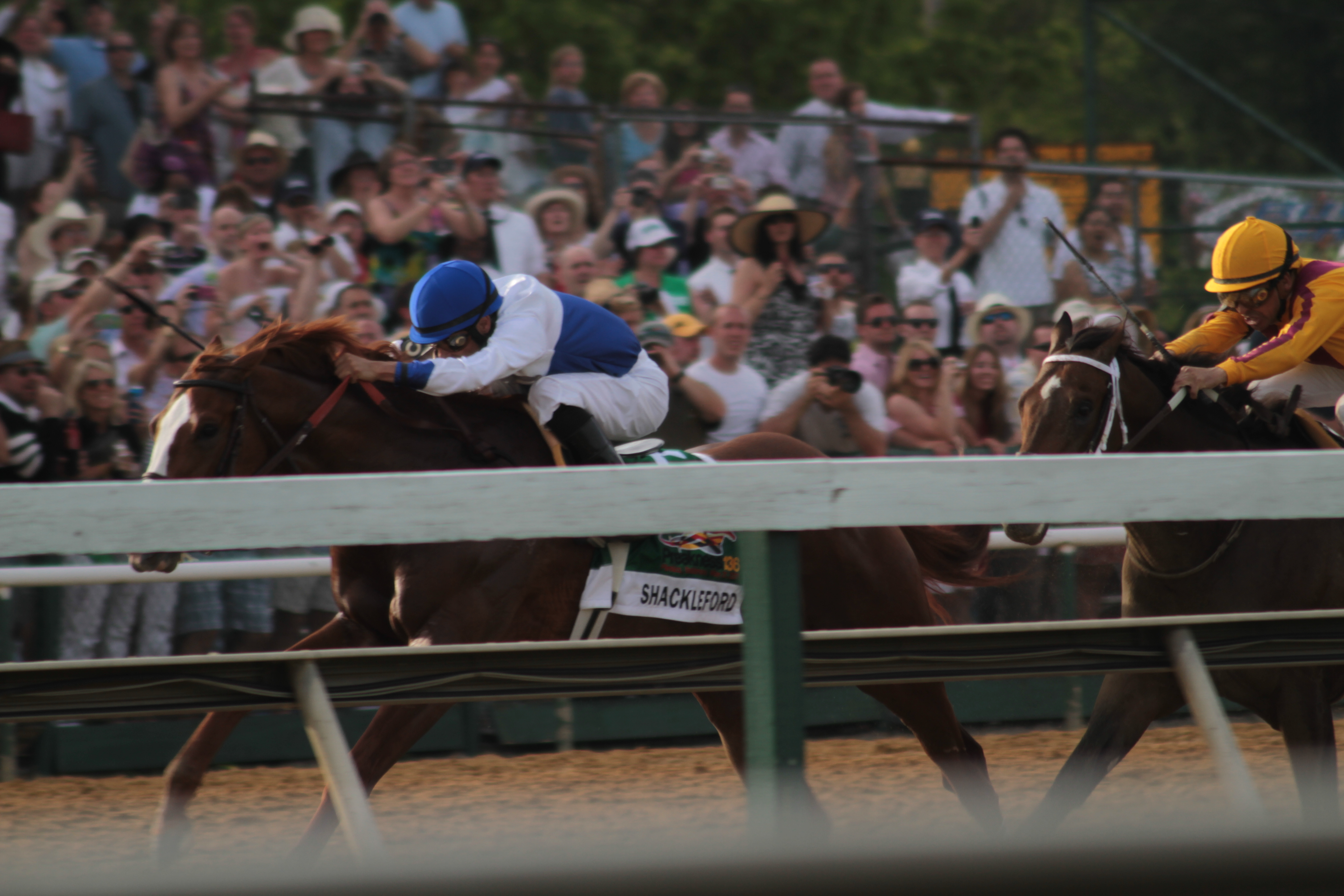
The Preakness Stakes, the second leg of the Triple Crown, is run every May at Pimlico Race Course in Baltimore.

The first professional sports organization in the United States, The Maryland Jockey Club, was formed in Baltimore in 1743. Preakness Stakes, the second race in the United States Triple Crown of Thoroughbred Racing, has been held every May at Pimlico Race Course in Baltimore since 1873.

College lacrosse is a common sport in the spring, as the Johns Hopkins Blue Jays men's lacrosse team has won 44 national championships, the most of any program in history. In addition, Loyola University won its first men's NCAA lacrosse championship in 2012.

The Baltimore Blast are a professional arena soccer team that play in the Major Arena Soccer League at the SECU Arena on the campus of Towson University. The Blast have won nine championships in various leagues, including the MASL; a previous Blast franchise played in the Major Indoor Soccer League from 1980 to 1992, winning one championship.

Other local clubs have included the semi-professional soccer sides FC Baltimore 1729 (founded 2018 in the National Premier Soccer League) and the Baltimore Bohemians, and Baltimore City F.C., an American Premier Soccer League club playing since 2023 at Utz Field in Patterson Park. The Baltimore Blues were a semi-professional rugby league club that began competition in the USA Rugby League in 2012.

The Baltimore Grand Prix ran along the streets of downtown's Inner Harbor from 2011 to 2013, hosting the American Le Mans Series and IndyCar Series before being discontinued over scheduling conflicts. The Baltimore Marathon, the flagship of several races, begins and ends at Camden Yards, winding through neighborhoods including the Inner Harbor, Federal Hill, Fells Point, Canton, and Patterson Park.

The Baltimore Brigade were an Arena Football League team based in Baltimore that, from 2017 to 2019, played at Royal Farms Arena. In 2019, the team ceased operations along with the rest of the league.

== Parks and recreation ==
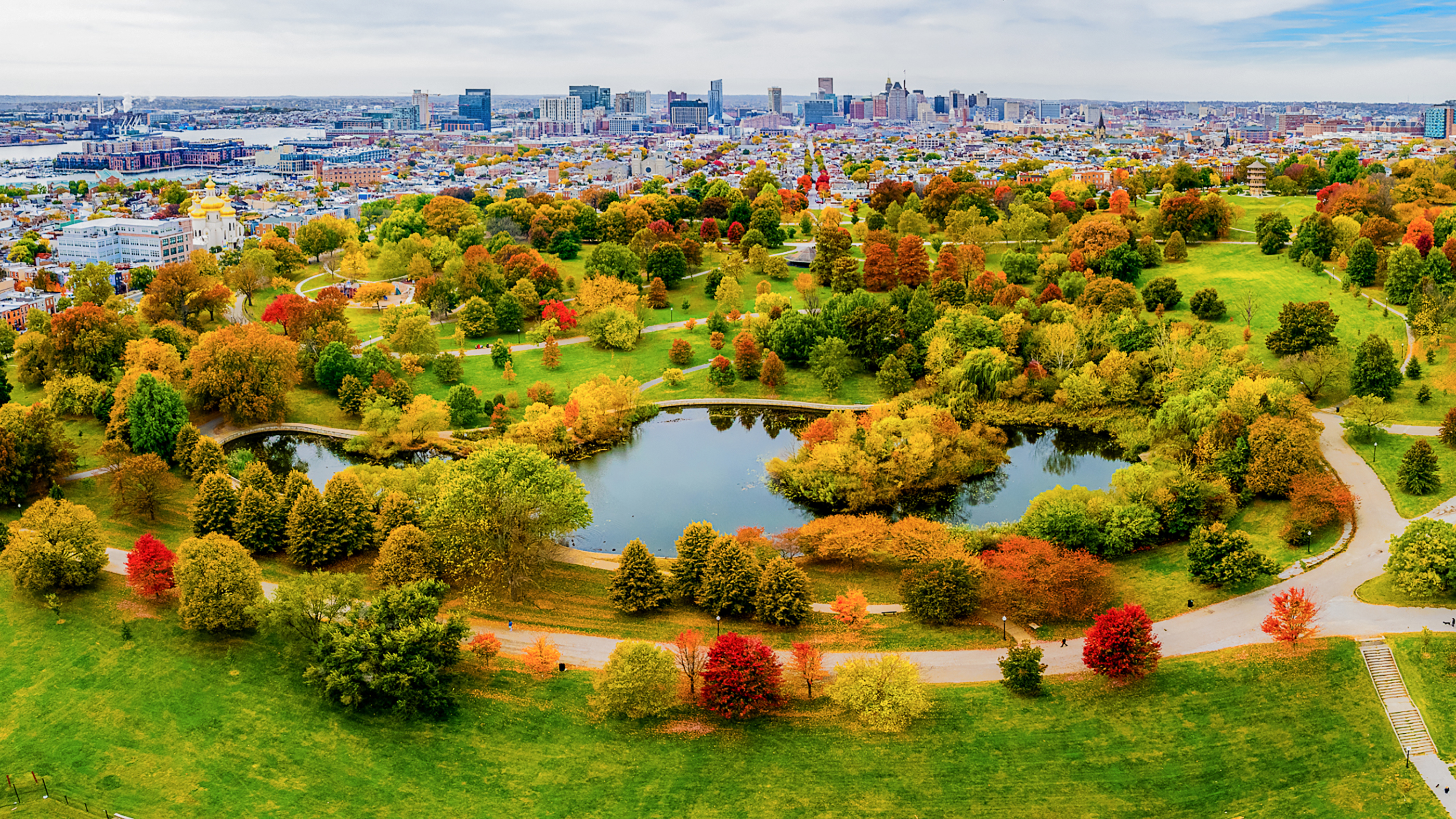
Patterson Park in October

Baltimore has over 4,900 acres (1,983 ha) of parkland. The Baltimore City Department of Recreation and Parks manages the majority of parks and recreational facilities in the city, including Patterson Park, Federal Hill Park, and Druid Hill Park. Gwynns Falls/Leakin Park, the city's most extensive park, is also the second-largest urban woodland in the nation. The city is home to Fort McHenry National Monument and Historic Shrine, a coastal star-shaped fort best known for its role in the War of 1812. As of 2015, The Trust for Public Land, a national land conservation organization, ranks Baltimore 40th among the 75-largest U.S. cities.

== Law, government, and politics ==
Baltimore is an independent city, and not part of any county. For most governmental purposes under Maryland law, Baltimore City is treated as a county-level entity. The United States Census Bureau uses counties as the basic unit for presentation of statistical information in the United States, and treats Baltimore as a county equivalent for those purposes.

M. Hirsch Goldberg, a former press secretary for a mayor of the city, stated in the Baltimore Sun that because Baltimore is not in a county, there is no county-wide government that could assist the city, and that the city does not have as much political representation in the Maryland Legislature. Goldberg argued that the status of not being in a county, along with the total square mileage, which he characterized as small, was damaging the city's fortunes.

Baltimore has been a Democratic stronghold for over 150 years, with Democrats dominating every level of government. In virtually all elections, the Democratic primary is the real contest. As of the 2020 elections, registered Democrats outnumbered registered Republicans by almost 10-to-1. No Republican has been elected to the City Council since 1939. The city's last Republican mayor, Theodore McKeldin, left office in 1967. No Republican candidate since then has received 30 percent or more of the vote. In the 2016 and 2020 mayoral elections, the Republicans were pushed into third place by write-in and independent candidates, respectively. The last Republican candidate for president to win the city was Dwight Eisenhower in his successful reelection bid in 1956.

The city hosted the first six Democratic National Conventions, from 1832 through 1852, and hosted the DNC again in 1860, 1872, and 1912.

=== Voter registration ===
Voter registration and party enrollment as of March 2024
Democratic	296,108	75.12%
Unaffiliated	62,566	15.87%
Republican	28,400	7.2%
Libertarian	1,192	0.3%
Other parties	5,931	1.5%
Total	394,197	100%

=== City government ===
==== Mayor ====
Brandon Scott is the current mayor of Baltimore. He was elected in 2020 and took office on December 8, 2020.

Scott succeeded Jack Young, who became acting mayor in April 2019 and then mayor upon the resignation of Catherine Pugh, who left office amid a self-dealing book-sales scandal. Pugh, a Democrat, had won the 2016 election with 57.1% of the vote.

Stephanie Rawlings-Blake, previously City Council President, became mayor in February 2010 upon Dixon's resignation and won a full term in 2011. Sheila Dixon, Baltimore's first female mayor, had taken office in 2007 after Martin O'Malley became governor; she resigned in 2010 following an embezzlement conviction and an Alford plea to a perjury charge, as Maryland does not allow convicted felons to hold office.

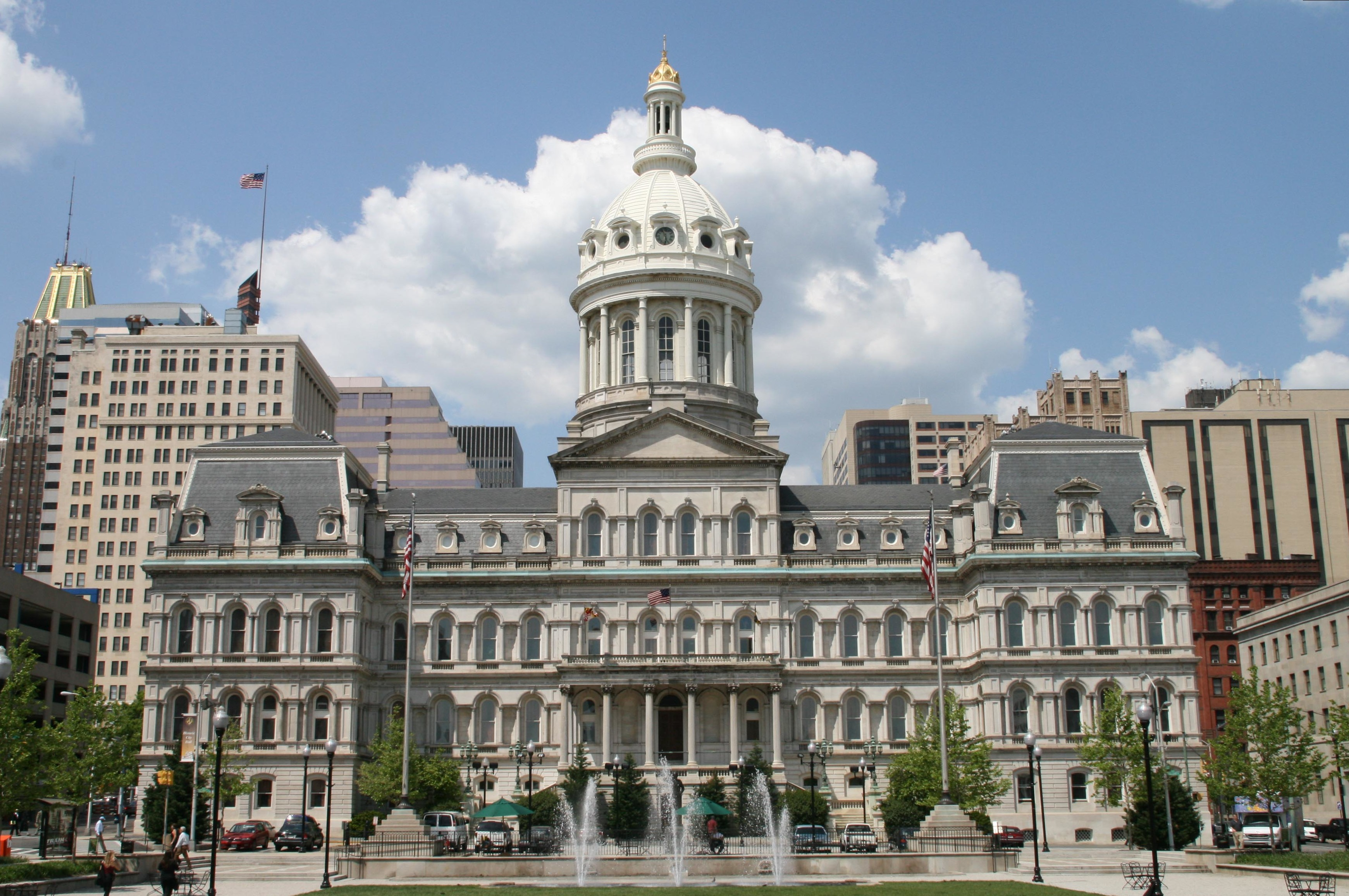
Baltimore City Hall

==== Baltimore City Council ====
The Baltimore City Council is made up of 14 members elected from single-member districts and a council president elected at-large. The council president is ex officio mayor pro tempore; if the mayor's office falls vacant, the council president ascends as mayor for the balance of the term.

Grassroots pressure for reform, voiced as Question P, restructured the city council in November 2002, against the will of the mayor, the council president, and the majority of the council. A coalition of union and community groups, organized by the Association of Community Organizations for Reform Now (ACORN), backed the effort.

==== Law enforcement ====
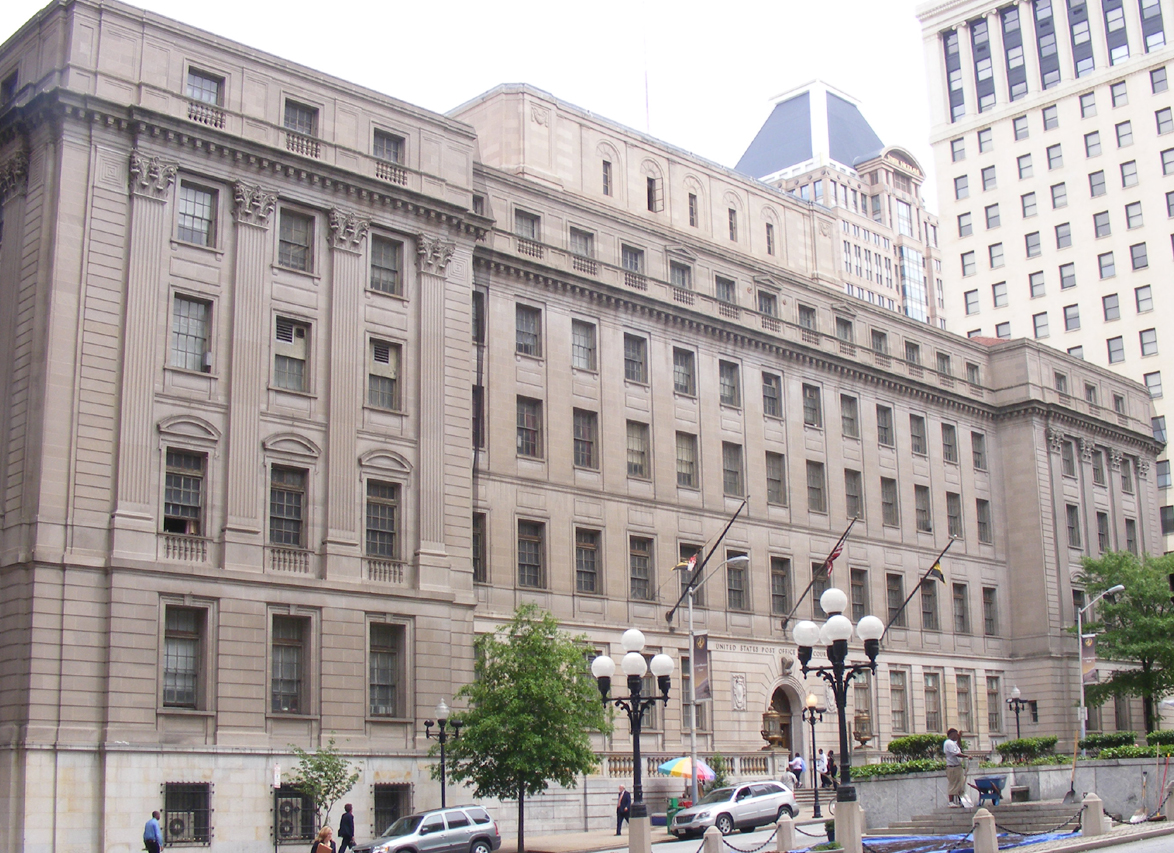
Courthouse East in Baltimore is a historic combined post office and federal courthouse in Battle Monument Square.

The Baltimore City Police Department is the primary law enforcement agency serving Baltimore. It began in 1784 as a night watch and day constable system, was reorganized as a city department in 1853, and came under State of Maryland supervision in 1859. Campus and building security for the city's public schools is provided by the Baltimore City Public Schools Police, established in the 1970s.

In 2015, Baltimore agreed to pay $6.4 million to settle civil claims by the family of Freddie Gray, a sum greater than the combined settlements from 120 police brutality and misconduct lawsuits filed from 2011 to 2015.

Other agencies also have roles in the city, including the Maryland Transportation Authority Police (patrolling the Fort McHenry Tunnel and Baltimore Harbor Tunnel), the Maryland Transit Administration Police, the Baltimore City Sheriff's Office, and United States Coast Guard Sector Baltimore on the Patapsco River and Chesapeake Bay.

===== Crime =====
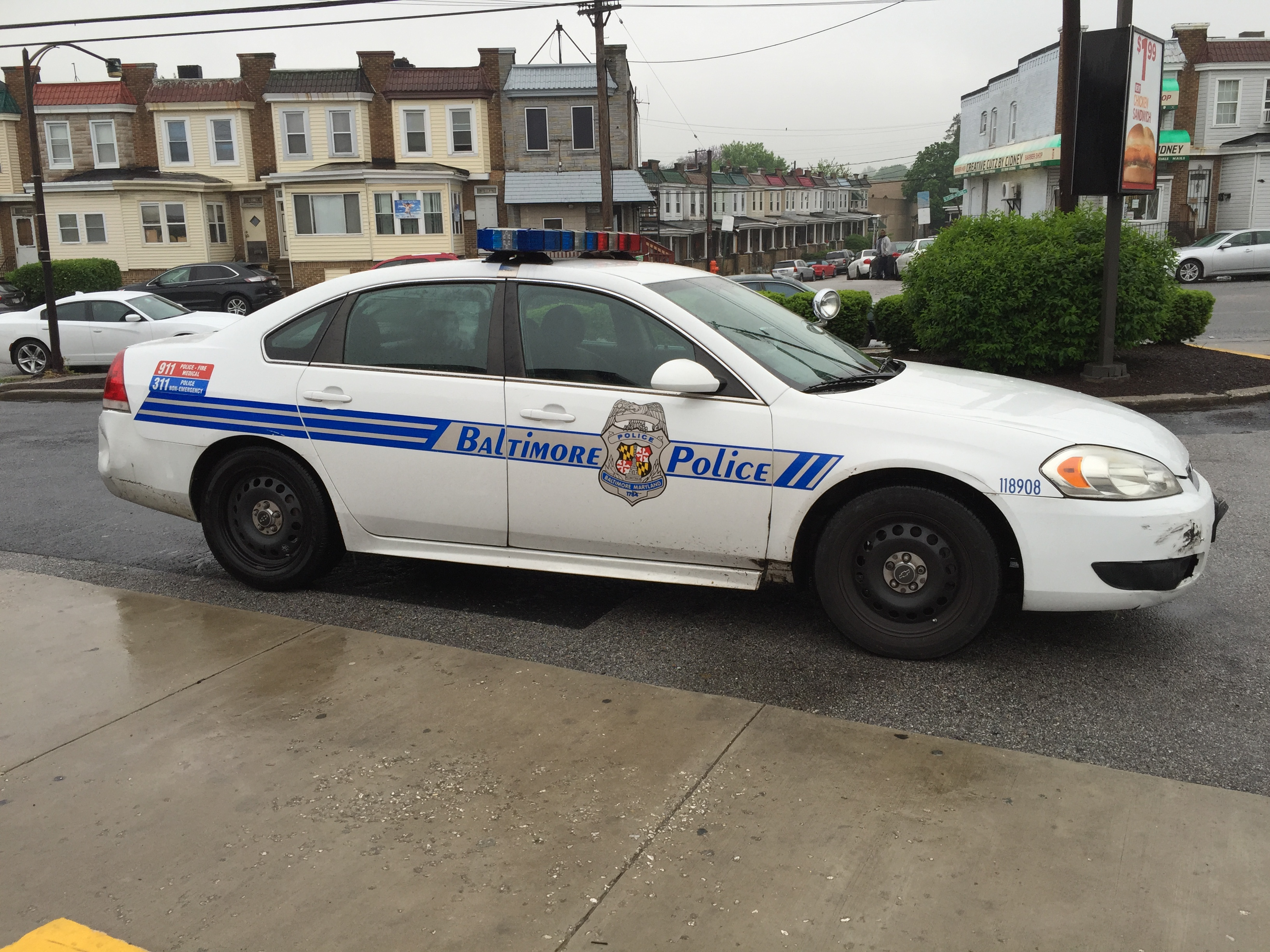
A Baltimore Police Department patrol car, May 2018

Baltimore has had a high violent-crime and homicide rate for decades, even as overall reported crime fell substantially from the mid-1990s to the mid-2010s. Homicides peaked at 353 in 1993 and reached 344 in 2015, when the city recorded its highest homicide rate because its population had declined. After remaining above 300 annually from 2016 through 2022, homicides declined to 263 in 2023 and 200 in 2024.

==== Baltimore City Fire Department ====
Baltimore is protected by the over 1,800 professional firefighters of the Baltimore City Fire Department (BCFD), founded in 1858 to replace the city's warring volunteer companies. The BCFD operates out of 37 fire stations throughout the city.

=== State government ===
Since the legislative redistricting in 2002, Baltimore has had six legislative districts located entirely within its boundaries, giving the city six seats in the 47-member Maryland Senate and 14 in the 141-member Maryland House of Delegates. During the previous 10-year period, Baltimore had four legislative districts within the city limits, but four others overlapped the Baltimore County line. As of October 2024, all of Baltimore's state senators and delegates were Democrats.

=== Federal government ===
Baltimore is split between two of the state's eight congressional districts. Most of the city is included in the 7th district, represented by Kweisi Mfume. A sliver of northern Baltimore is located in the 2nd district, represented by Johnny Olszewski. Both are Democrats. A Republican has not represented a significant portion of Baltimore in Congress since John Boynton Philip Clayton Hill represented the 3rd District in 1927, and has not represented any of Baltimore since the Eastern Shore-based 1st District lost its share of Baltimore after the 2000 census. It was represented by Republican Wayne Gilchrest at the time.

Maryland's former United States senator Ben Cardin is from Baltimore. He was one of three people who, over four decades, represented the 3rd District—long including much of inner Baltimore—before election to the U.S. Senate, the others being Paul Sarbanes and Barbara Mikulski.

United States presidential election results for Baltimore, Maryland
Year	Republican		Democratic		Third party(ies)	
Year	No.	%	No.	%	No.	%
1892	36,492	40.79%	51,098	57.12%	1,867	2.09%
1896	61,965	58.13%	40,859	38.33%	3,777	3.54%
1900	58,880	52.10%	51,979	46.00%	2,149	1.90%
1904	47,444	48.64%	47,901	49.11%	2,192	2.25%
1908	51,528	49.82%	49,139	47.51%	2,756	2.66%
1912	15,597	15.70%	48,030	48.36%	35,695	35.94%
1916	49,805	44.31%	60,226	53.58%	2,382	2.12%
1920	125,526	57.02%	86,748	39.40%	7,872	3.58%
1924	69,588	42.63%	60,222	36.89%	33,442	20.48%
1928	135,182	51.39%	126,106	47.94%	1,770	0.67%
1932	78,954	31.94%	160,309	64.84%	7,969	3.22%
1936	97,667	31.48%	210,668	67.89%	1,959	0.63%
1940	112,364	35.56%	199,715	63.20%	3,917	1.24%
1944	112,817	40.83%	163,493	59.17%	0	0.00%
1948	110,879	43.67%	134,615	53.02%	8,396	3.31%
1952	166,605	47.62%	178,469	51.01%	4,784	1.37%
1956	178,244	55.90%	140,603	44.10%	0	0.00%
1960	114,705	36.13%	202,752	63.87%	0	0.00%
1964	76,089	24.02%	240,716	75.98%	0	0.00%
1968	80,146	27.65%	178,450	61.56%	31,288	10.79%
1972	119,486	45.15%	141,323	53.40%	3,843	1.45%
1976	81,762	31.40%	178,593	68.60%	0	0.00%
1980	57,902	21.87%	191,911	72.48%	14,962	5.65%
1984	80,120	28.20%	202,277	71.18%	1,766	0.62%
1988	59,089	25.43%	170,813	73.51%	2,465	1.06%
1992	40,725	16.62%	185,753	75.79%	18,613	7.59%
1996	28,467	15.53%	145,441	79.34%	9,415	5.14%
2000	27,150	14.11%	158,765	82.52%	6,489	3.37%
2004	36,230	16.96%	175,022	81.95%	2,311	1.08%
2008	28,681	11.66%	214,385	87.16%	2,902	1.18%
2012	28,171	11.09%	221,478	87.19%	4,356	1.71%
2016	25,205	10.53%	202,673	84.66%	11,524	4.81%
2020	25,374	10.69%	207,260	87.28%	4,827	2.03%
2024	27,984	12.13%	195,109	84.55%	7,661	3.32%

The Postal Service's Baltimore Main Post Office is located at 900 East Fayette Street in the Jonestown area.

The national headquarters for the United States Social Security Administration is located in Woodlawn, just outside of Baltimore.

== Education ==
=== Colleges and universities ===
Baltimore is the home of numerous places of higher learning, both public and private. 100,000 college students from around the country attend Baltimore City's 10 accredited two-year or four-year colleges and universities. Among them are:

==== Private ====
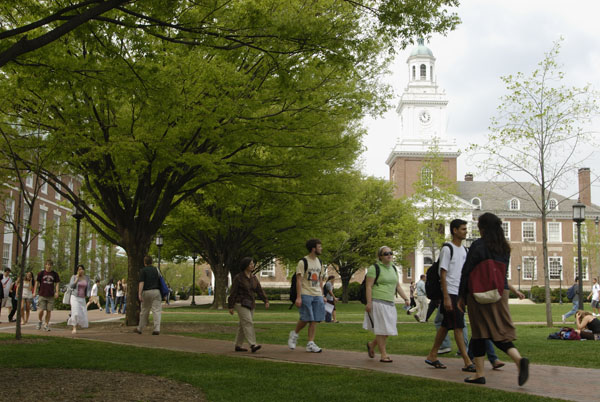
Keyser Quadrangle at Johns Hopkins University, the nation's first research university

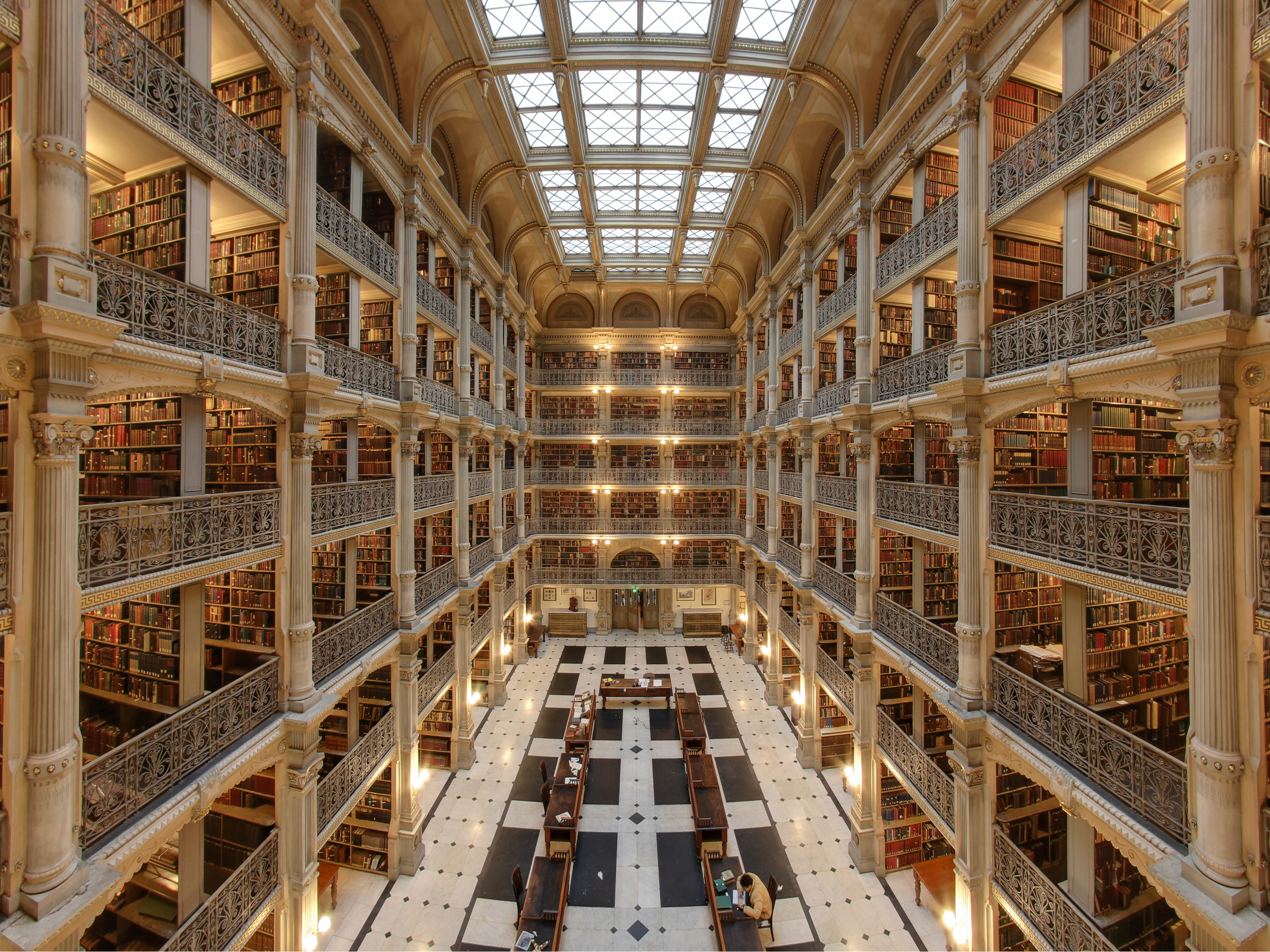
The interior of George Peabody Library at the Peabody Institute at Johns Hopkins University

- Johns Hopkins University
  - Bloomberg School of Public Health
  - Peabody Institute
- Loyola University Maryland
- Maryland Institute College of Art
- St. Mary's Seminary and University
- Notre Dame of Maryland University

==== Public ====
- Baltimore City Community College
- Coppin State University
- Morgan State University
- University of Baltimore
- University of Maryland, Baltimore

=== Primary and secondary schools ===
The city's public schools are managed by Baltimore City Public Schools. Notable among them are Frederick Douglass High School, the second-oldest African American high school in the United States; Baltimore City College, the third-oldest public high school in the nation; and Western High School, the oldest public all-girls school in the nation.

Baltimore City College and Baltimore Polytechnic Institute share the nation's second-oldest high school football rivalry.

== Transportation ==
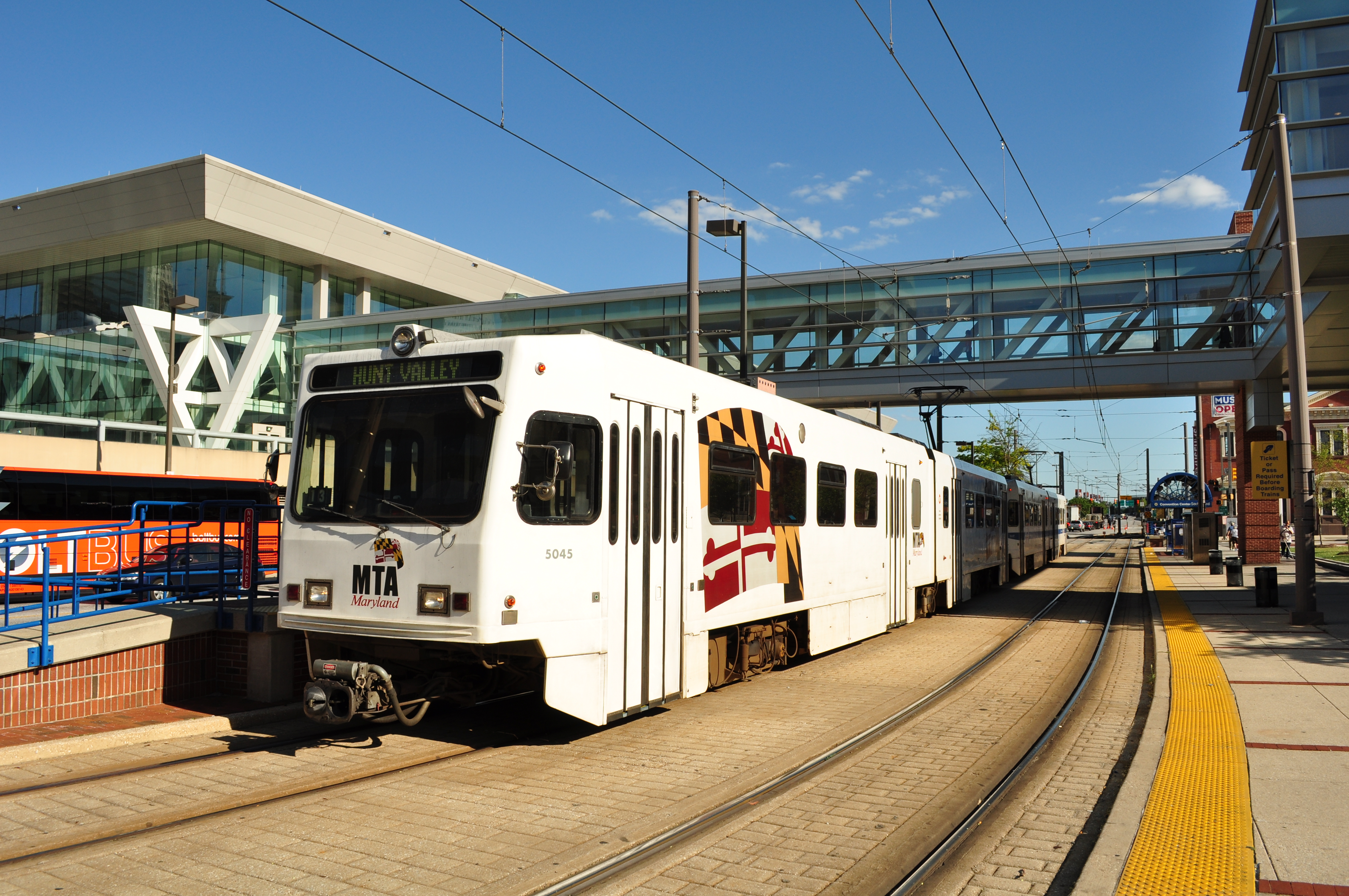
A Baltimore Light RailLink train stops at Convention Center station, just west of Baltimore Convention Center on Pratt Street.

Baltimore has a higher-than-average percentage of households without a car. In 2015, 30.7 percent of Baltimore households lacked a car, which decreased slightly to 28.9 percent in 2016. The national average was 8.7 percent in 2016. Baltimore averaged 1.65 cars per household in 2016, compared to a national average of 1.8.

=== Roads and highways ===
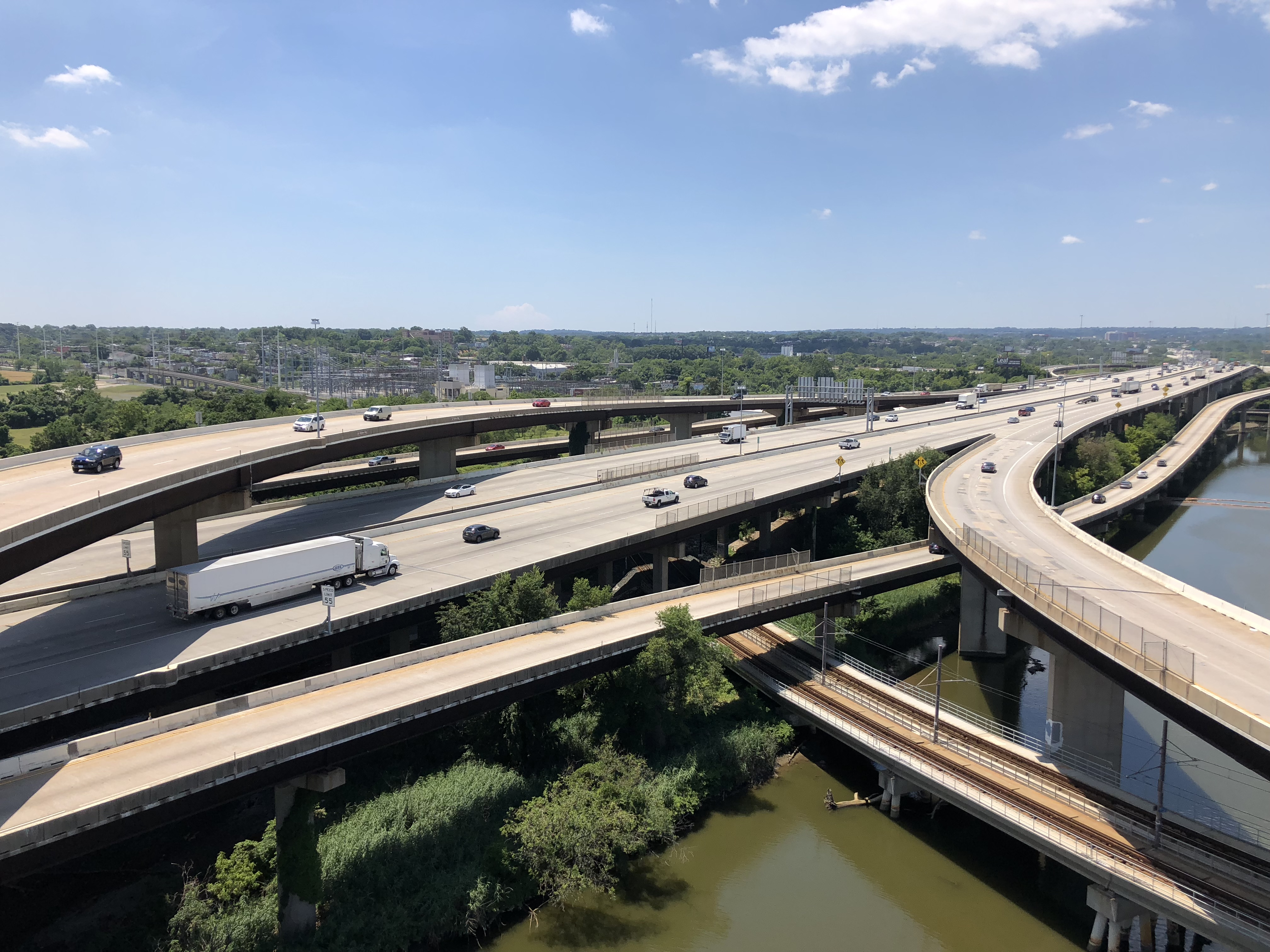
I-95 northbound in Baltimore

Baltimore's highway growth has done much to influence the development of the city and its suburbs. The first limited-access highway serving Baltimore was the Baltimore–Washington Parkway, which opened in stages between 1950 and 1954; its maintenance is split between the state of Maryland and the National Park Service, and trucks are restricted to its northern part. Tractor-trailers used U.S. Route 1 until Interstate 95 between Baltimore and Washington opened in 1971.

The Interstate highways serving Baltimore are I-70, I-83 (the Jones Falls Expressway), I-95, I-395, I-695 (the Baltimore Beltway), I-795 (the Northwest Expressway), I-895 (the Harbor Tunnel Thruway), and I-97. The city's mainline Interstate highways—I-95, I-83, and I-70—do not directly connect to each other, and in the case of I-70 end at a park and ride lot just inside the city limits, because of freeway revolts in Baltimore. These revolts were led primarily by Barbara Mikulski, a former United States senator for Maryland, which resulted in the abandonment of the original plan.

There are two tunnels traversing Baltimore Harbor within the city limits: the four-bore Fort McHenry Tunnel (opened in 1985 and serving I-95) and the two-bore Harbor Tunnel (opened in 1957 and serving I-895). Until its collapse in March 2024, the Baltimore Beltway crossed south of Baltimore Harbor over the Francis Scott Key Bridge.

The first interstate highway built in Baltimore was I-83 (the Jones Falls Expressway), whose first portion was built in the early 1960s through a natural corridor over the Jones Falls River, displacing no housing; a planned extension to I-95 was abandoned, and its route through parkland drew criticism. Planning for the Baltimore Beltway predates the creation of the Interstate Highway System.

The only U.S. Highways in the city are US 1, which bypasses downtown, and US 40, which crosses downtown from east to west. Both run along major surface streets, US 40 utilizes a small section of a freeway cancelled in the 1970s in the west side of the city, originally intended for Interstate 170. State routes in the city travel along surface streets, with the exception of Maryland Route 295, which carries the Baltimore–Washington Parkway.

The Baltimore City Department of Transportation (BCDOT) maintains the city's streets, sidewalks, and alleys, road signs, and street lights, and handles vehicle towing and traffic cameras. Its responsibilities include the state and U.S. highways and the portions of I-83 and I-70 within the city limits; I-95, I-395, I-695, and I-895 are instead maintained by the Maryland Transportation Authority.

=== Transit systems ===
==== Public transit ====
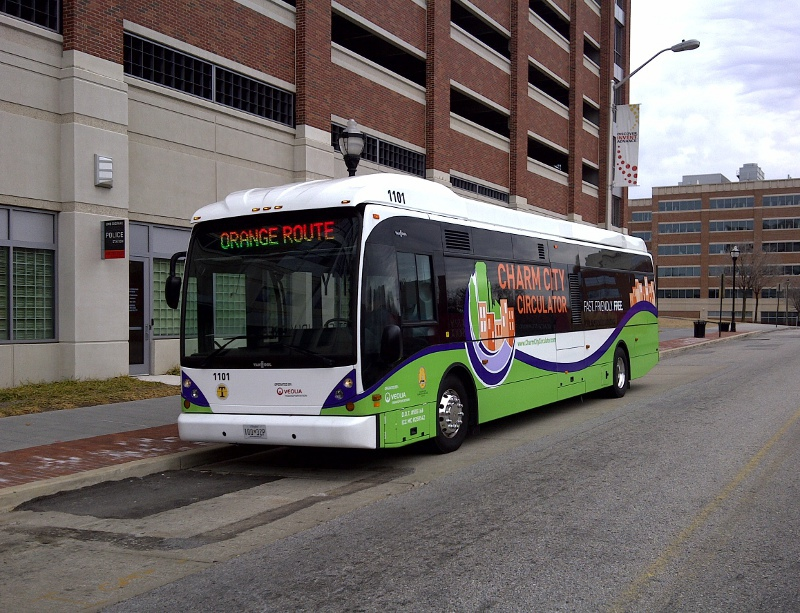
Charm City Circulator Van Hool on the Orange Line

Public transit in Baltimore is mostly provided by the Maryland Transit Administration (abbreviated "MTA Maryland") and Charm City Circulator. MTA Maryland operates a comprehensive bus network, including many local, express, and commuter buses.

The Charm City Circulator (CCC), a free shuttle bus service operated for the Baltimore City Department of Transportation, began running in the downtown area in January 2010. Funded partly by an increase in parking fees, it provides free service seven days a week across four color-coded routes linking downtown with Johns Hopkins Hospital, Fells Point, Federal Hill, Harbor East, and Fort McHenry.

Baltimore has a water taxi service, operated by Baltimore Water Taxi. The water taxi's six routes provide service throughout the city's harbor, and was purchased by Under Armour CEO Kevin Plank's Sagamore Ventures in 2016.

In June 2017, the BaltimoreLink bus network redesign was launched. The BaltimoreLink redesign consisted of a dozen high frequency, color-coded routes branded CityLink, running every 10 to 15 minutes through downtown Baltimore, along with changes to local and express bus service, rebranded LocalLink and ExpressLink.

===== Rail transportation =====
- Baltimore Metro SubwayLink is a rapid transit line opened in November 1983 that connects downtown Baltimore (Johns Hopkins Hospital) with the northwest suburbs of the city, extending to Owings Mills, Maryland.
- Baltimore Light RailLink is a light rail line that opened in April 1992 that runs from the northern suburbs of Baltimore (Hunt Valley) to the southern suburbs (Glen Burnie and BWI Airport), passing directly through the downtown of the city.
- A proposed rail line, known as the Red Line, which would link the Social Security Administration's headquarters in Woodlawn to Johns Hopkins Bayview Medical Center in East Baltimore, was cancelled in June 2015 by former Governor Larry Hogan. In June 2023, Governor Wes Moore announced the relaunch of the Red Line project.

==== Intercity rail ====
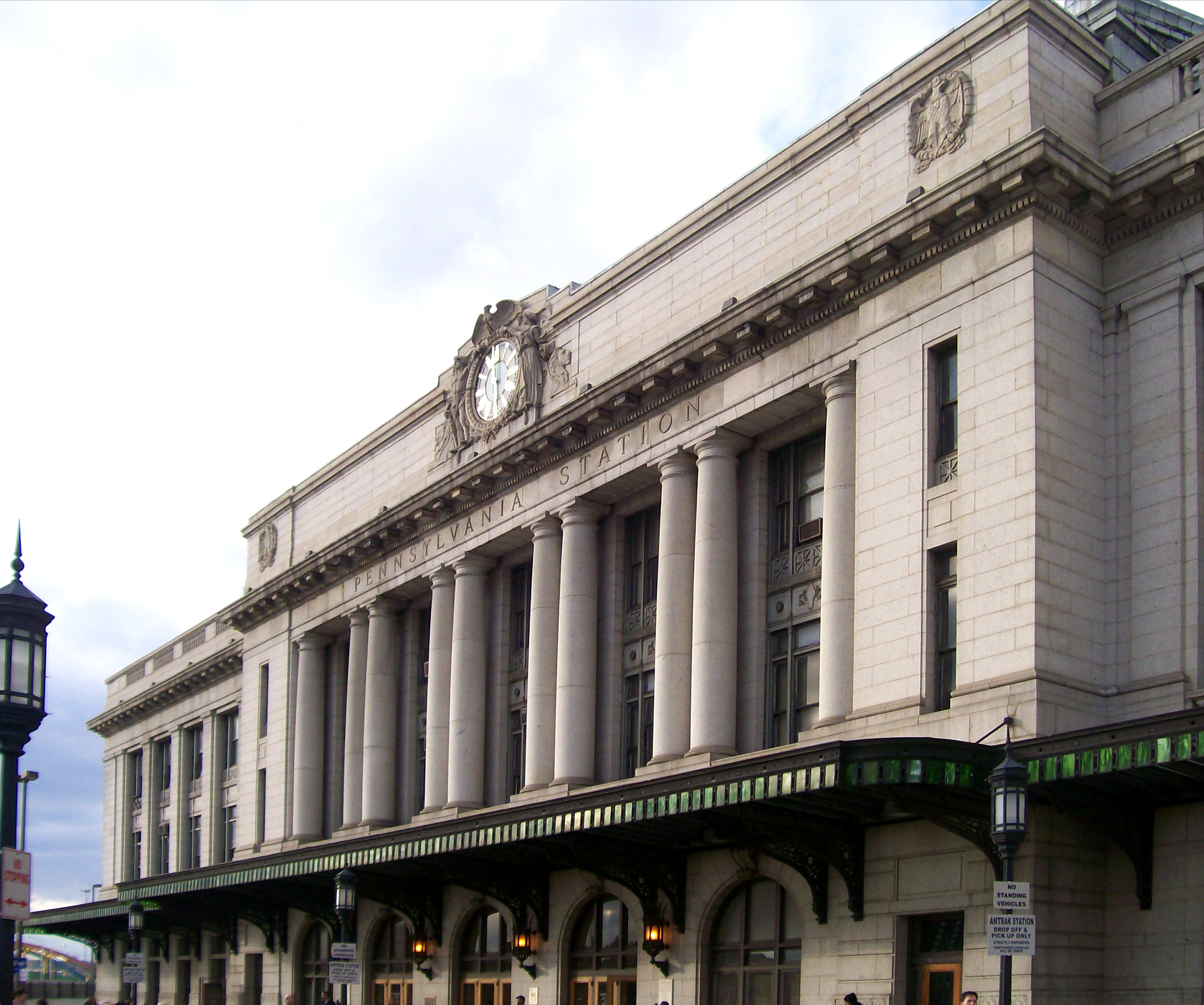
Baltimore Pennsylvania Station in Baltimore, the seventh-busiest rail station in the nation

Baltimore is a top destination for Amtrak along the Northeast Corridor, and its Penn Station is one of the busiest in the country—ranked the seventh-busiest U.S. rail station as of 2014. The corridor approaches from the south through the 1873 Baltimore and Potomac Tunnel, whose 30 mph (50 km/h) limit, sharp curves, and steep grades make it one of the NEC's worst bottlenecks, and from the north through the 1873 Union Tunnel.

Just outside the city, BWI Thurgood Marshall Airport Rail Station is another stop. Scheduled Amtrak services include the Acela Express, Northeast Regional, and several long-distance trains such as the Silver Star, Silver Meteor, Crescent, and Vermonter. MARC commuter rail (the Brunswick, Camden, and Penn lines) connects Camden Station and Penn Station with Washington, D.C.'s Union Station and stops in between; the Penn Line added weekend service in 2013.

=== Airports ===
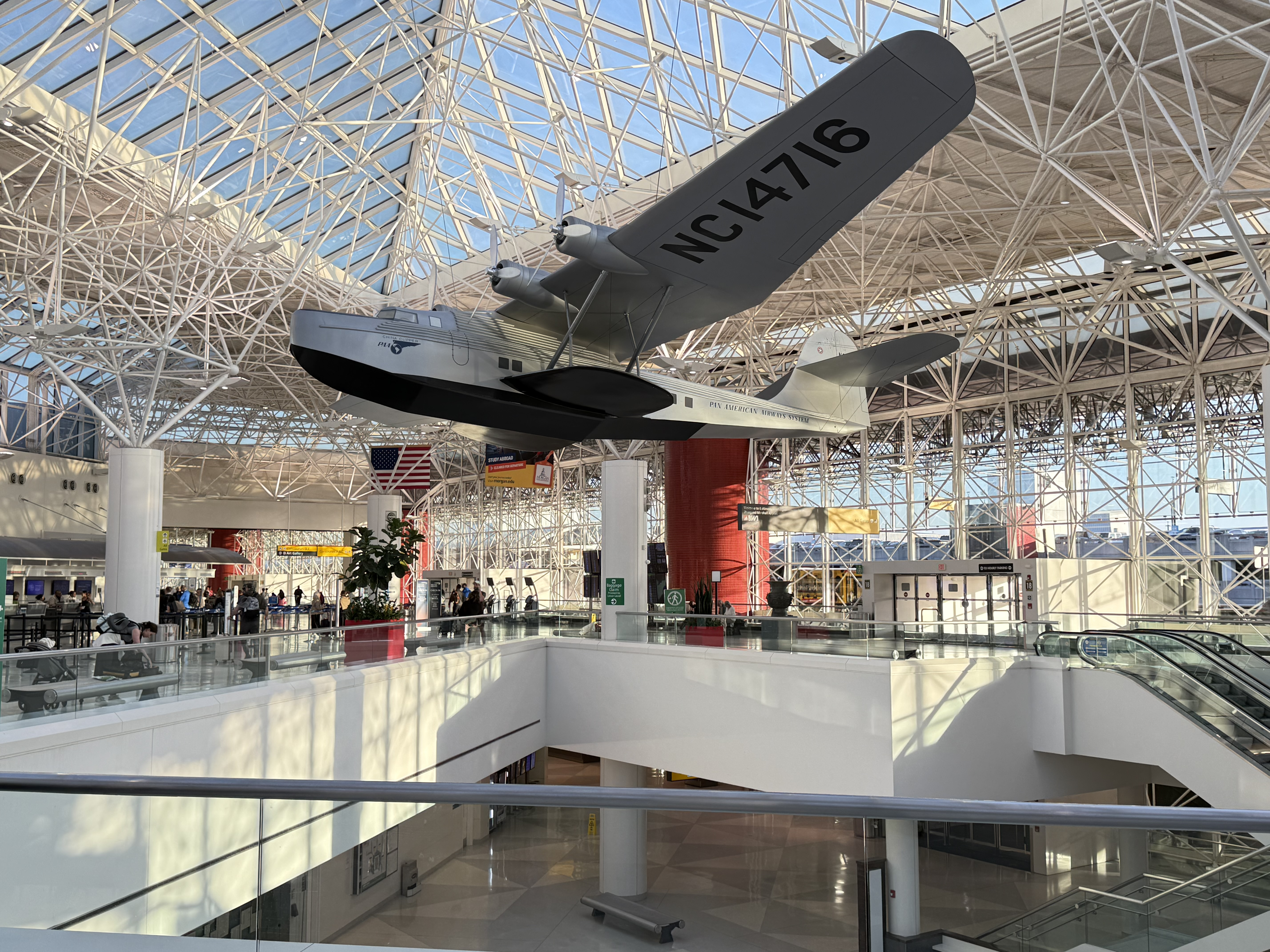
The interior of Baltimore–Washington International Thurgood Marshall Airport, Baltimore's international commercial airport

Baltimore is served by two airports, both operated by the Maryland Aviation Administration, which is part of the Maryland Department of Transportation. Baltimore–Washington International Thurgood Marshall Airport, generally known as "BWI", is the main international airport in the Baltimore area. It lies about 10 miles (16 km) to the south of Baltimore in neighboring Anne Arundel County. The airport is named after Thurgood Marshall, a Baltimore native who was the first African American to serve on the Supreme Court of the United States. In terms of passenger traffic, BWI is the 22nd busiest airport in the United States. As of 2014, BWI is the largest, by passenger count, of three major airports serving the Baltimore–Washington Metropolitan Area. It is accessible by I-95 and the Baltimore–Washington Parkway via Interstate 195, the Baltimore Light Rail, and Amtrak and MARC Train at BWI Rail Station.

Baltimore is also served by Martin State Airport, a general aviation facility, to the northeast in Baltimore County. Martin State Airport is linked to downtown Baltimore by Maryland Route 150 (Eastern Avenue) and by MARC Train at its own station.

=== Pedestrians and bicycles ===
Baltimore has a comprehensive, signed system of unnumbered bicycle routes, with roads marked by bike lanes, sharrows, or Share the Road signs. The network continues to expand, with over 140 miles (230 km) of lanes added between 2006 and 2014, and the city has also built bike boulevards, beginning with Guilford Avenue in 2012.

The city has three major trail systems—the Gwynns Falls Trail, the Jones Falls Trail, and the Herring Run Trail—the first two of which carry sections of the East Coast Greenway. Protected cycle tracks on Maryland Avenue, Mount Royal Avenue, and Monument Street form the backbone of the downtown bicycle network, while the Stony Run Trail follows part of the old Ma and Pa Railroad corridor. A 2011 study by Walk Score ranked Baltimore the 14th-most walkable of the fifty largest U.S. cities.

=== Port of Baltimore ===
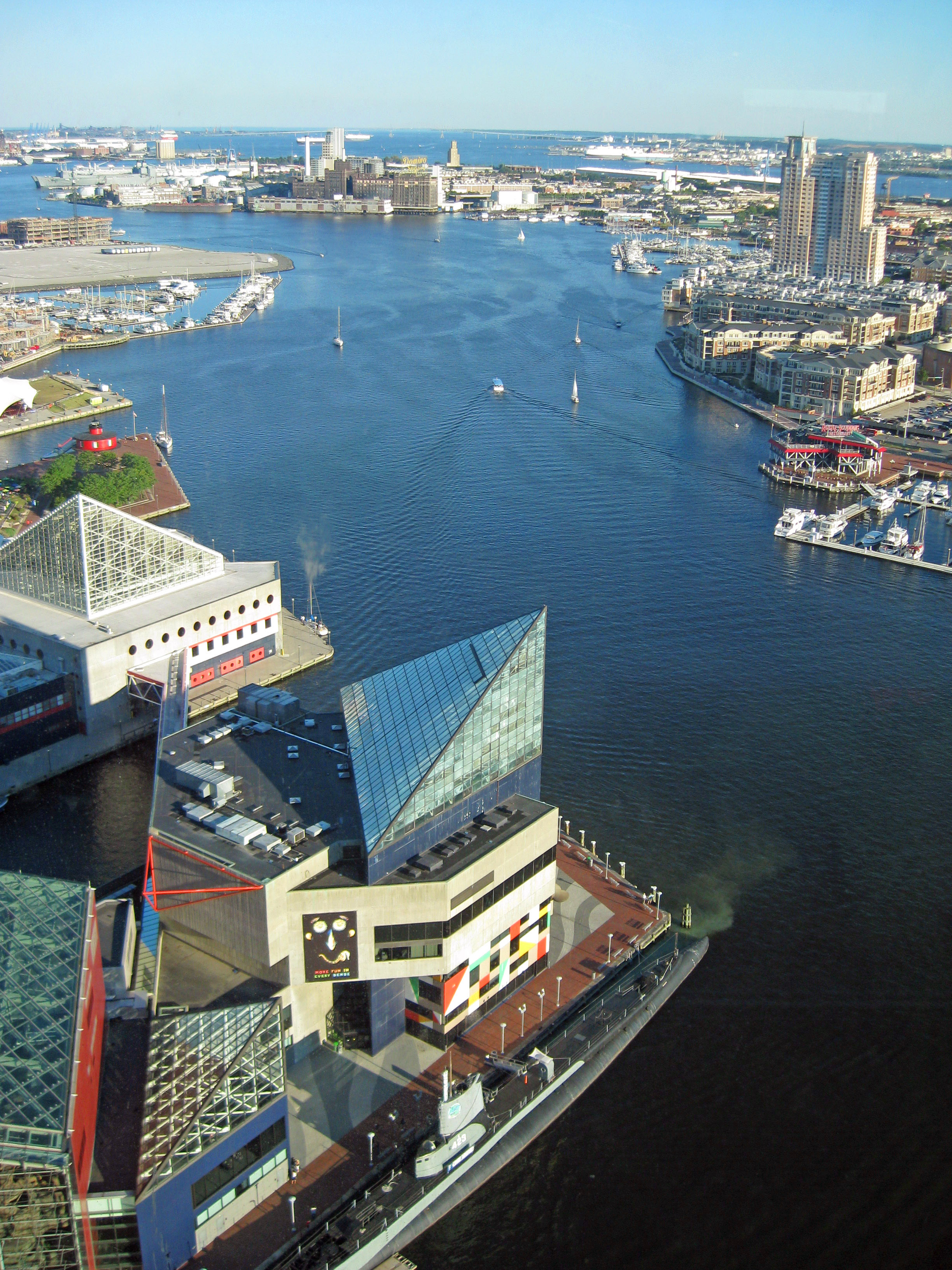
The Inner Harbor in Baltimore

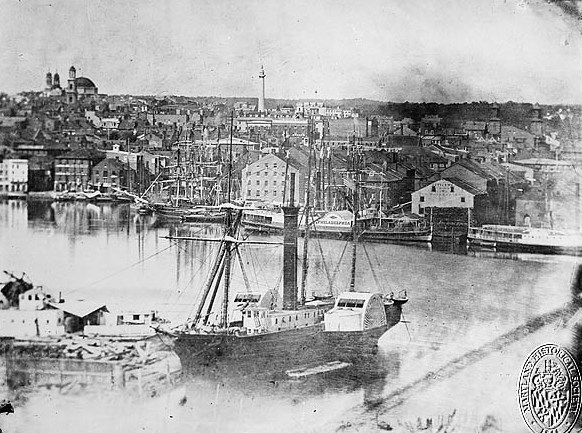
The Port of Baltimore with the Washington Monument in the background in 1849

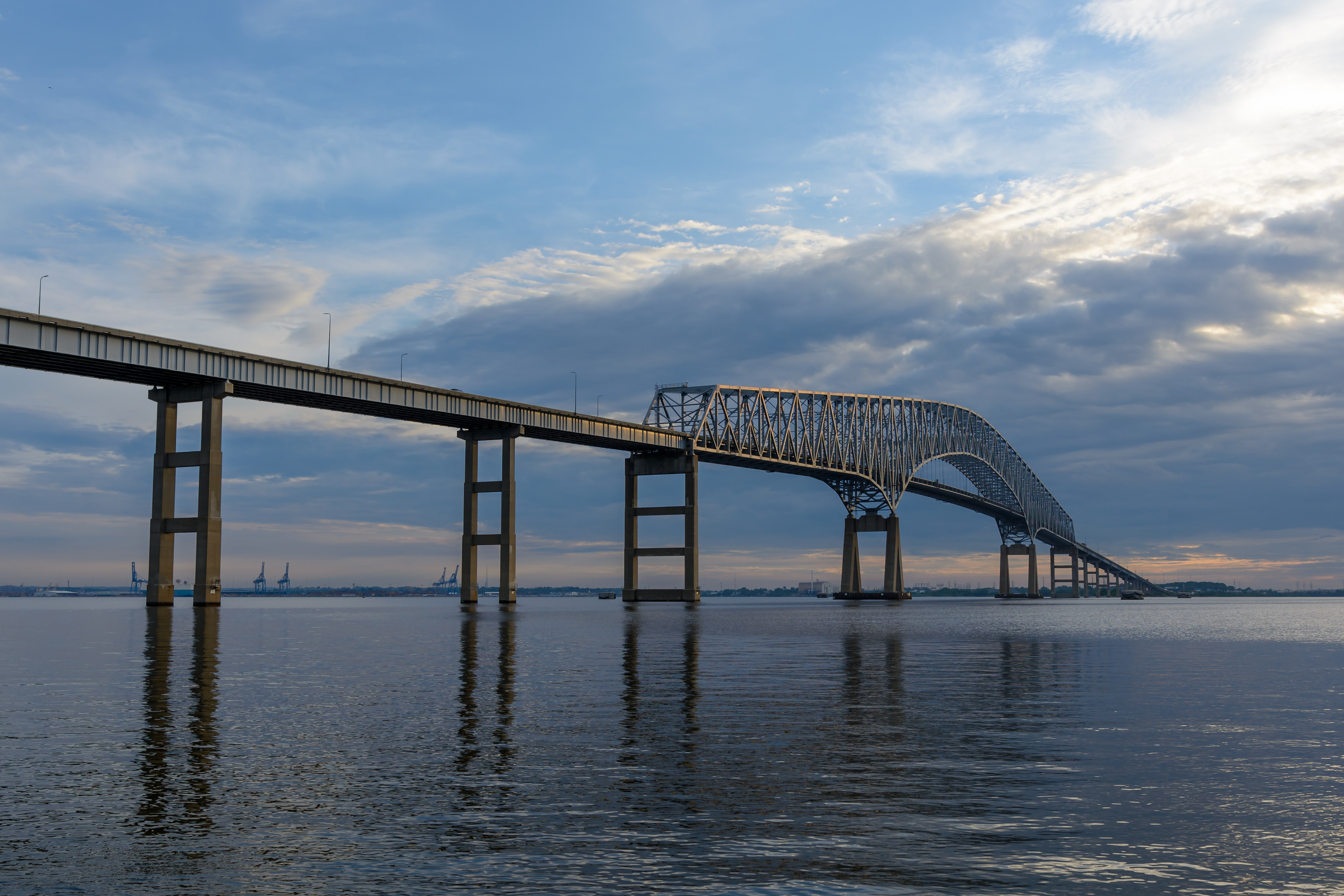
Francis Scott Key Bridge crossing the Port of Baltimore in 2015

The port was founded in 1706, preceding the founding of Baltimore. The Maryland colonial legislature made the area near Locust Point as the port of entry for the tobacco trade with England. Fells Point, the deepest point in the natural harbor, soon became the colony's main ship building center, later on becoming leader in the construction of clipper ships.

After Baltimore's founding, mills were built behind the wharves, and the California Gold Rush brought orders for fast vessels. By the end of the nineteenth century, European ship lines maintained immigrant terminals there, and the Baltimore and Ohio Railroad made the port a major transshipment point. The port has major roll-on/roll-off and bulk facilities, especially for steel handling.

Water taxis operate in the Inner Harbor. Governor Ehrlich participated in naming the port after Helen Delich Bentley during the 300th anniversary of the port.

In 2007, Duke Realty Corporation began the Chesapeake Commerce Center, a 184-acre (0.74 km^{2}) industrial park on the site of a former General Motors plant in eastern Baltimore. The Port of Baltimore is one of two East Coast seaports with a 50-foot (15 m) dredge able to accommodate the largest shipping vessels.

The port also has a passenger cruise terminal offering year-round trips on several lines to the Bahamas, the Caribbean, New England, and Canada, where passengers can park and board beside ships visible from Interstate 95; about a third of cruise passengers come from Pennsylvania, New York, and New Jersey.

== Environment ==
=== Trash interceptors ===
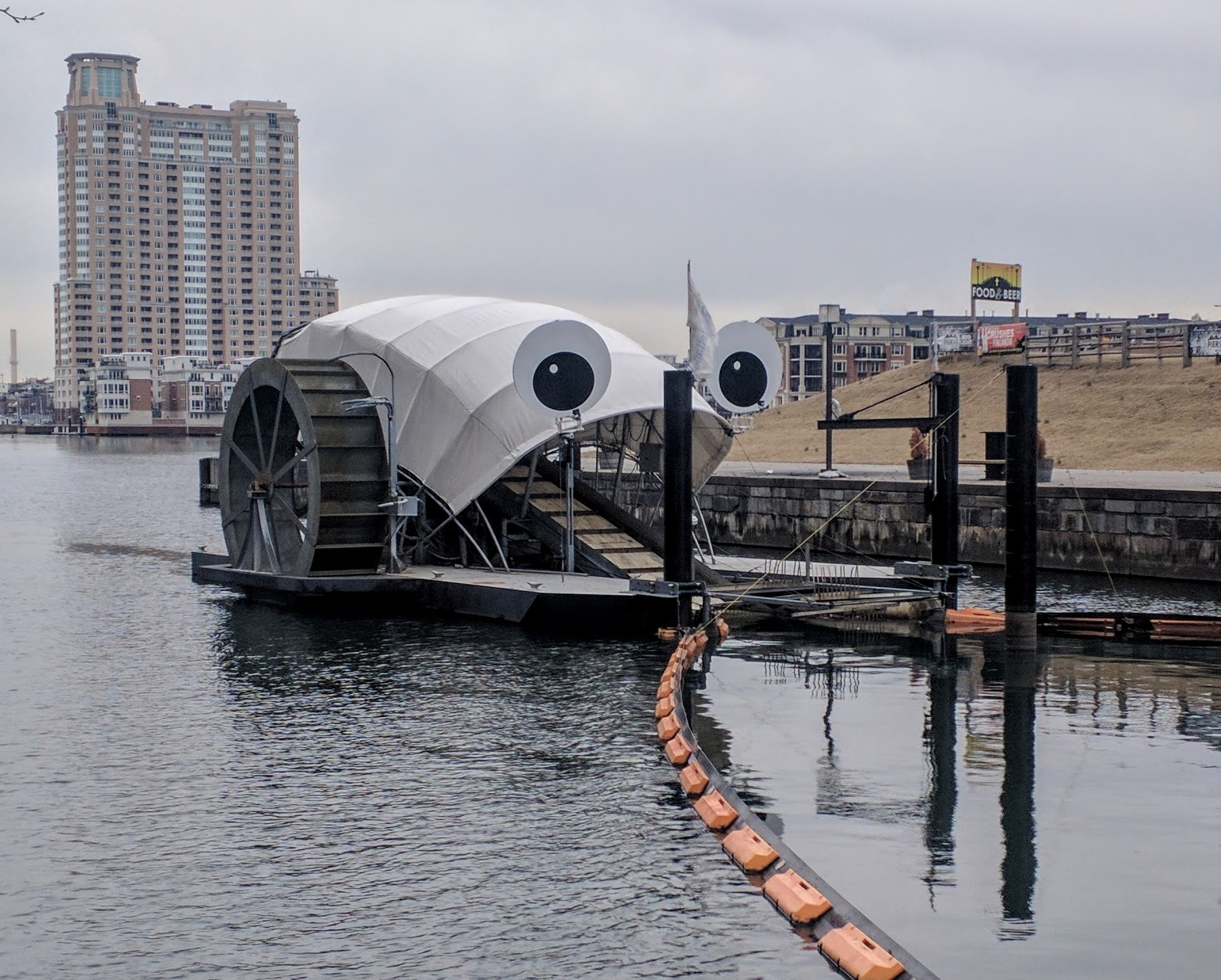
The "Mr. Trash Wheel" trash interceptor at the mouth of the Jones Falls River in Baltimore's Inner Harbor

Baltimore has four water wheel trash interceptors for removing garbage in area waterways. One is at the mouth of Jones Falls in Baltimore's Inner Harbor, dubbed "Mr. Trash Wheel". Another, "Professor Trash Wheel", was added at Harris Creek in the Canton neighborhood in 2016, with "Captain Trash Wheel" following at Mason Creek in 2018, and "Gwynnda, the Good Wheel of the West" at the mouth of the Gwynns Falls in 2021. A February 2015 agreement with a local waste-to-energy plant is believed to make Baltimore the first city to use reclaimed waterway debris to generate electricity.

=== Other water pollution control ===
In August 2010, the National Aquarium assembled, planted, and launched a floating wetland island designed by Biohabitats in Baltimore's Inner Harbor. Hundreds of years ago, Baltimore's harbor shoreline would have been lined with tidal wetlands. Biohabitats also developed a concept to transform a dilapidated wharf into a living pier that cleans Harbor water, provides habitat and is an aesthetic attraction. Currently under design, the top of the pier will become a constructed tidal wetland.

Other projects to improve water quality include the Blue Alleys project, expanded street sweeping, and stream restoration.

=== Air quality and pollution ===
Since 1985 the Wheelabrator Baltimore incinerator, formerly known as the Baltimore Refuse Energy Systems Co., has operated as a waste-to-energy incinerator. The incinerator is a significant source of air pollution to nearby neighborhoods. Several environmental groups, such as the Environmental Integrity Project, and the Chesapeake Climate Action Network, have been successful in advocating for reinforced pollution monitoring. The incinerator is the city's single largest standing source of air pollution.

== Media ==
Baltimore's main media outlet since 2010 is The Baltimore Sun, which was sold by its Baltimore owners in 1986 to the Times Mirror Company, and then bought by the Tribune Company in 2000. Since the sale, The Baltimore Sun prints some local news along with regional and national articles. The Baltimore News-American, another long-running paper that competed with the Sun, ceased publication in 1986.

The city is home to the Baltimore Afro-American, an influential African American newspaper founded in 1892.

In 2006, The Baltimore Examiner was launched to compete with The Sun. It was part of a national chain that includes The San Francisco Examiner and The Washington Examiner. In contrast to the paid subscription Sun, The Examiner was a free newspaper funded solely by advertisements. Unable to turn a profit and facing a deep recession, The Baltimore Examiner ceased publication on February 15, 2009.

Despite being located 40 miles northeast of Washington, D.C., Baltimore is a major media market in its own right, with all major English language television networks represented in the city. WJZ-TV 13 is a CBS owned and operated station, and WBFF 45 (Fox, with MyNetworkTV on DT2) is the flagship of Sinclair Broadcast Group, the second-largest station owner in the country. Other major television stations in Baltimore include WMAR-TV 2 (ABC), WBAL-TV 11 (NBC), WUTB 24 (Roar), WNUV 54 (CW), and WMPB 67 (PBS). Baltimore is also served by low-power station WMJF-CD 39 (Ion), which transmits from the campus of Towson University.

Nielsen ranked Baltimore as the 27th-largest television market in 2009. Arbitron's Fall 2010 rankings identified Baltimore as the 22nd-largest radio market.

== International relations ==
Baltimore has ten sister cities, as designated by Sister Cities International. Baltimore's own Sister City Committees recognize nine of these sister cities, which are shaded yellow and marked with a dagger (†):

Sister cities of Baltimore per Sister Cities International
City	Country	Year designated
Alexandria†	Egypt	1995
Ashkelon	Israel	1974
Changwon†	South Korea	2018
Gbarnga†	Liberia	1973
Kawasaki†	Japan	1979
Luxor†	Egypt	1995
Odesa†	Ukraine	1974
Piraeus†	Greece	1982
Rotterdam†	Netherlands	1985
Xiamen†	China	1985

Three additional sister cities have "emeritus status":

Sister cities emeritius of Baltimore per Sister Cities International
City	Country	Year designated
Genoa	Italy	1985
Ely O'Carroll	Ireland	
Bremerhaven	Germany	2007

== In popular culture ==
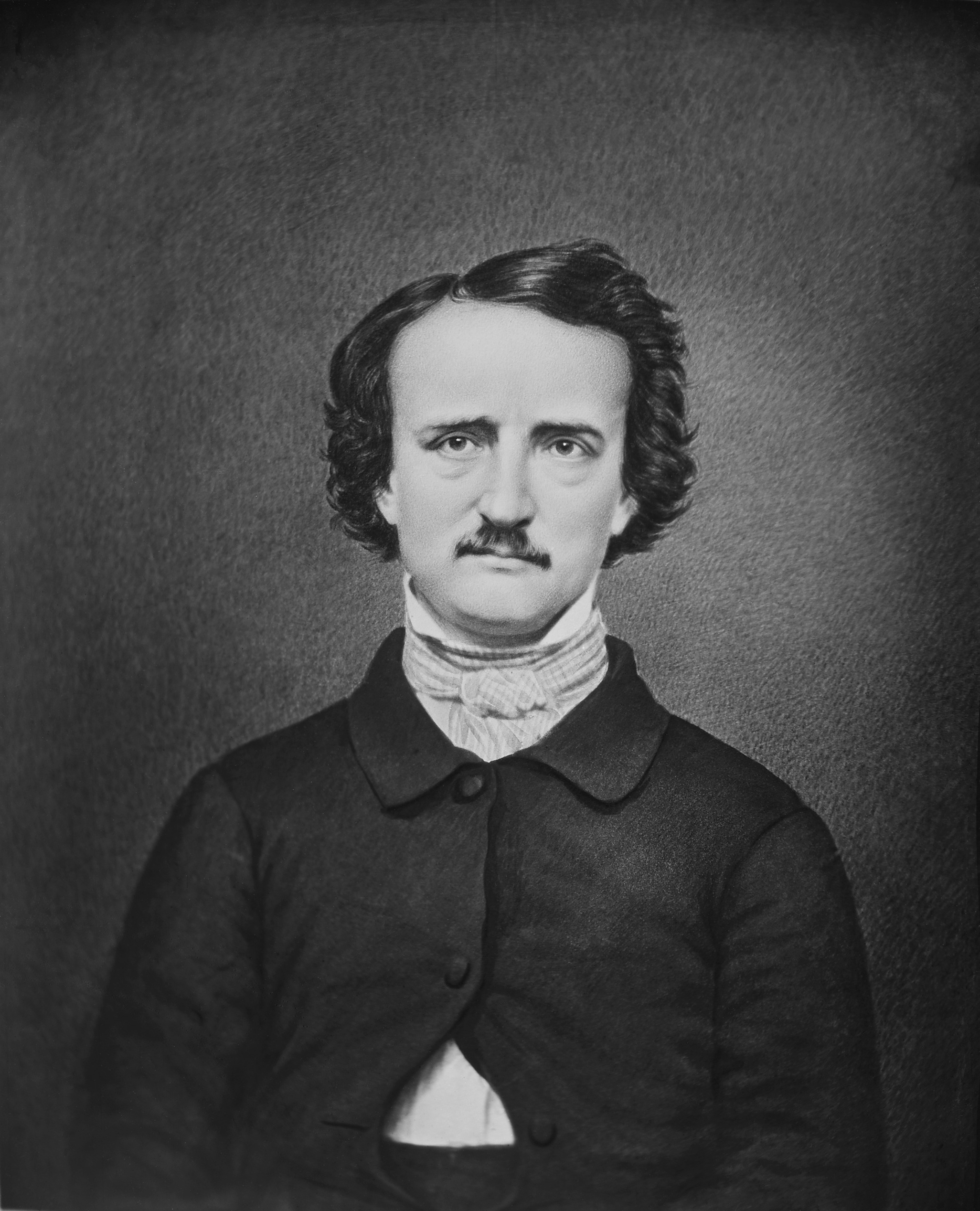
Poe depicted in a retouched version of a daguerreotype, held at the National Archives at College Park

=== Literature ===
Edgar Allan Poe lived in several different cities including Baltimore, which is where he died and was buried. Several of his works were inspired and written during his time in the city including "MS. Found in a Bottle" and "Berenice".

In 1922, F. Scott Fitzgerald—who had deep ties to Baltimore as a relative and namesake of Francis Scott Key—published the short story The Curious Case of Benjamin Button, about a man born in Baltimore who ages backwards. Fitzgerald lived in the city for five years in the 1930s, partly so that Zelda could receive psychiatric care at Johns Hopkins and the Sheppard-Pratt Hospital; his first editor was the "Sage of Baltimore", H.L. Mencken.

Anne Tyler has lived in Baltimore since the late 1960s and is known for her literary realism fiction that emphasizes family life. She has written a number of books set locally including The Accidental Tourist (1985), Breathing Lessons (1988), Digging To America (2006) and A Spool of Blue Thread (2015).

=== Nonfiction ===
In 1845, Frederick Douglass published his memoir: Narrative of the Life of Frederick Douglass, an American Slave. Born on the Eastern Shore, Douglass arrived in Baltimore as a child. It is where he learned to read and write.

In 2008, journalist, novelist and activist Ta-Nehisi Coates published his memoir of growing up in West Baltimore: The Beautiful Struggle. Coates writes of his challenging relationship with his father, troubled experiences in local schools and the street crime and drug epidemic of the 1990s.

=== Film ===
Barry Levinson is a film maker and a native Baltimorean. Several of his films pay homage to his upbringing in an immigrant family in the city: Diner (1982), Tin Men (1987), Avalon (1990), and Liberty Heights (1999).

Another Baltimore filmmaker, John Waters, began his career making experimental art films in the city including Roman Candies and Mondo Trasho. As his audience and film budgets expanded, Waters continued to set his films in Baltimore and to premier them at the Senator Theater. His most famous films include Hairspray (1988), Cry Baby (1990), and Serial Mom (1994). Waters has continued to live in Baltimore and remains active in the local arts community.

=== Television ===
The television representations of Baltimore often involve crime or law enforcement. From 1993 to 1998, the police procedural drama Homicide: Life on the Street aired with favorable reviews but low ratings. Several episodes of the X-Files (1993–2002) took place in Baltimore. The Corner (2000) is a mini-series based on a true story of people living amid the open air drug markets of West Baltimore. The most known series set in Baltimore is The Wire (2002–2008), which was well received and depicts the city as a war zone between drug trade and the police. In 2022, the limited drama series We Own This City premiered, starring Jon Bernthal and native Baltimorean Josh Charles.

== See also ==
- Baltimore in fiction
- Baltimore National Heritage Area
- Crime in Baltimore
- Culture of Baltimore
- List of tallest buildings in Baltimore
- USS Baltimore

Preceded by Philadelphia, Pennsylvania	Capital of the United States of America; 1776–1777	Succeeded by Philadelphia, Pennsylvania
