= Geology of Delaware =

Coordinates: 39°42′N 75°42′W

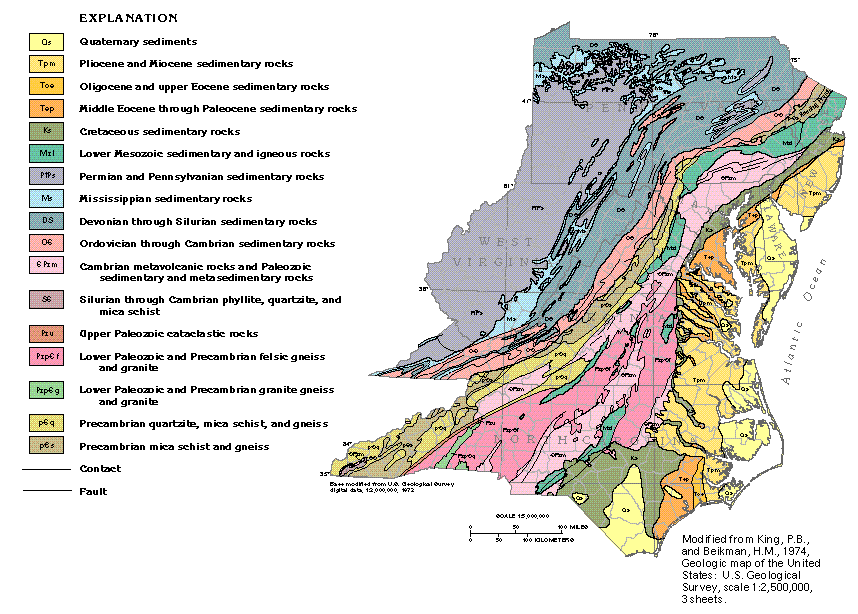
Geological map featuring the crystalline and sedimentary rock types in the Mid-Atlantic segment of the Appalachian Mountains

The geology of Delaware consists of two physiographic provinces located in the U.S. state of Delaware. They are the Atlantic Coastal Plain and the Piedmont.

== Coastal plain ==
The coastal plain in Delaware is by far the largest province, encompassing all of the state south of the Kirkwood Highway from Newark to Wilmington. The unconsolidated sediments of the coastal plain range in age from Cretaceous to recent. They consist of gravels, sands, silt, and clay, with varying mixtures of all four. The oldest layer, the Potomac Formation also contains some scattered lignite.

As recently as five million years ago, much of present-day Delaware was submerged as the floor of a shallow sea, the Salisbury Embayment; only with the retreat of global sea levels in recent geologic times did the coastal plain areas of the state emerge as dry land.

=== Atlantic coastline ===
Delaware has a 25-mile (40 km) coastline that includes the communities of Henlopen Acres, Rehoboth Beach, Dewey Beach, Bethany Beach, South Bethany, and Fenwick Island. Headlands are located at Rehoboth and Bethany and one inlet, Indian River Inlet serves as the only "natural" access to Rehoboth and Indian River Bays. The other areas are known as bay barriers and provide the only separation from the Atlantic Ocean from the lagoons.

Off shore there are two shoal fields; Hen and Chickens shoal and Fenwick Island shoal. These two areas pose a hazard to boaters. The longshore drift along the coast is generally north with a node just below South Bethany moving the sand south toward Ocean City, Maryland. Further offshore, the Delaware River paleovalley, which existed during the most recent ice age, is filled with recent sediments scoured and re-deposited as sea level rose.

== Piedmont ==
The Piedmont Physiographic Region of Delaware only includes the hills of northern New Castle County, which rise to approximately 400 feet (120 m) above sea level. The Piedmont extends into neighboring Pennsylvania and Maryland.

The rocks exposed in the Piedmont are metamorphic and igneous rocks that are approximately half a billion to 1.2 billion years old. The only Precambrian rock unit is the Baltimore Gneiss. Cambrian to Ordovician rocks include Wilmington Complex, Setters Formation, Cockeysville Marble, and Wissahickon Formation. Silurian rocks include the Iron Hill Gabbro, Bringhurst Gabbro, and Arden Plutonic Supersuite . The cities of Wilmington and Newark lie at the Fall Line, where the northern margin of the younger Cretaceous coastal plain sediments overlie the older Piedmont rocks.

== Geologic features ==
- Cape Henlopen DGS Special Publication 26
- Red Clay Valley DGS Special Publication 20
- Pollack Farm Fossil Site DGS Special Publication 21
- Carolina bays DGS Special Publication 24 shows Carolina Bays in Delaware

== Geological formations of Delaware ==
- Wissahickon Formation
- Wilmington Complex

== Delaware Geological Survey ==
The Delaware Geological Survey is the primary source of information about Delaware geology and hydrogeology, such as surface and sub-surface geologic rock formations, extent and quality of aquifers, stream and groundwater monitoring, water supply, earthquakes, floods and droughts, coastal processes (tides, beach erosion), topographic mapping, state mapping and GIS coordination. DGS research and service activities are focused on five areas: (1) geology, (2) hydrology, (3) natural hazards, (4) the state geospatial framework, and (5) information dissemination. These efforts impact a wide variety of issues ranging from water resources, agriculture, environmental protection, and energy and mineral resources to economic development, land-use planning, emergency management, public health, and recreation.
