= Baltimore Gneiss =

Geological formation in the United States

- Stratigraphic range: Precambrian
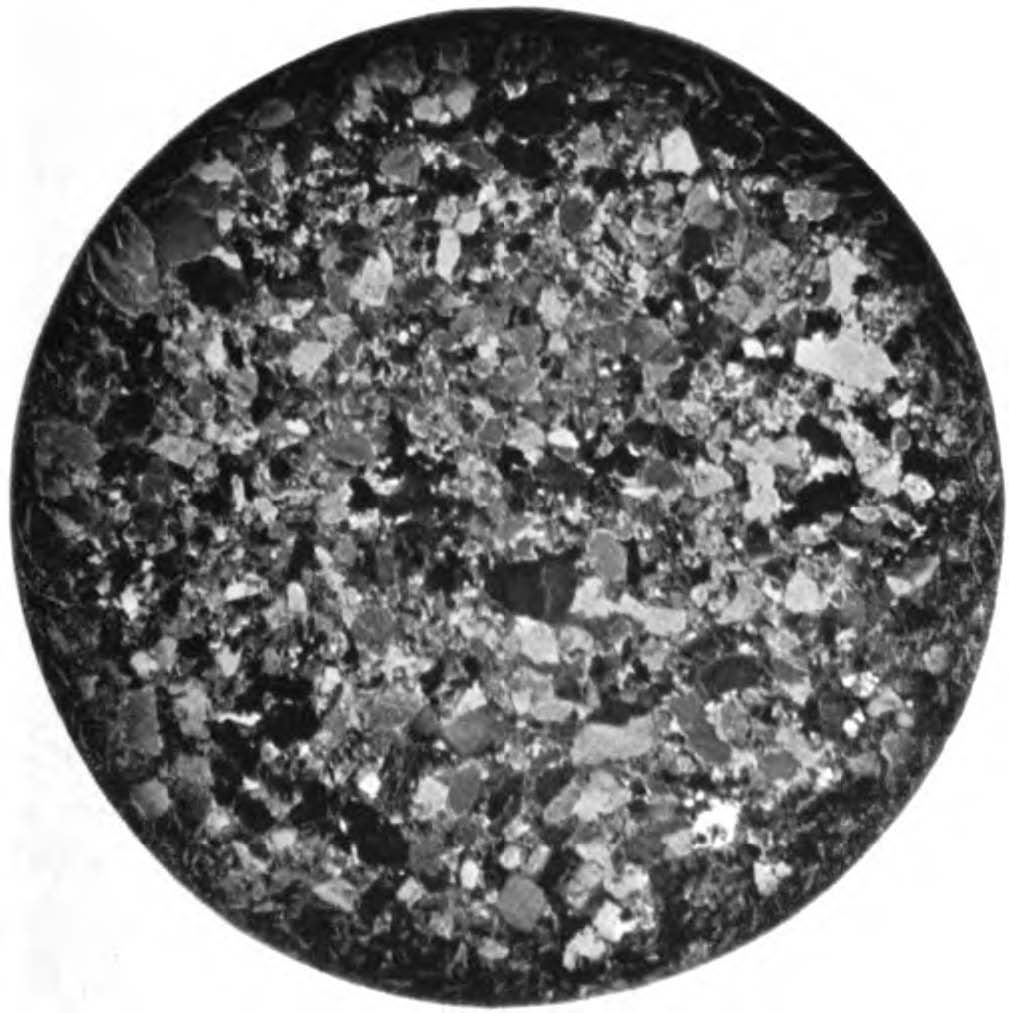
- Photomicrograph of Baltimore Gneiss
- Type: Geological formation
- Underlies: Setters Formation

Lithology
- Primary: Gneiss
- Other: Paragneiss and amphibolite

Location
- Region: Piedmont of eastern North America
- Country: United States
- Extent: Maryland

Type section
- Named for: Baltimore

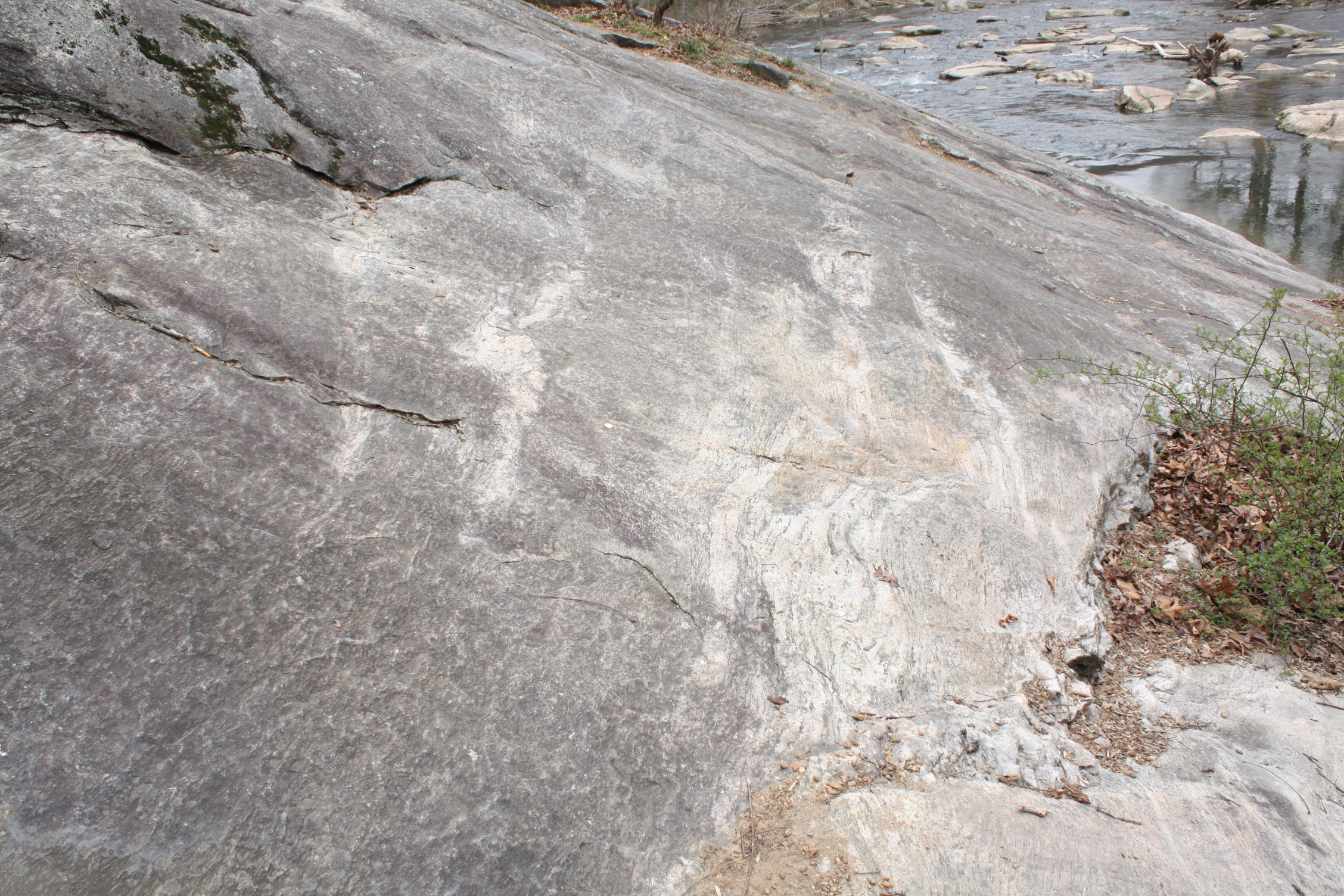
Outcrop of Baltimore Gneiss along the Patapsco River, Carroll County

The Baltimore Gneiss is a Precambrian geological formation in the Piedmont region of Maryland, Pennsylvania, and Delaware.

== Characteristics ==
At least 95 percent of the Baltimore Gneiss can be described as quartzo-feldspathic gneiss of granodioritic to granitic composition, with the remaining 5 percent consisting of amphibolite. The age of the Baltimore Gneiss has been constrained to 1.0-1.1 Ga.

=== Members ===
The Gneiss is homogeneous overall, but is recognized as having four subdivisions. These are the layered gneiss member, the augen gneiss member, the streaked-augen gneiss member, and the hornblende gneiss member. Additionally, the Baltimore Gneiss outcrops into three discrete masses of uniform, well-foliated to massive granitic gneiss referred to as the Slaughterhouse Gneiss.

The layered gneiss member consists of dark and light layers of gneiss bearing biotite, microcline, quartz, and plagioclase, varying from biotite schist to quartzo-feldspathic granofels interlayered on a centimeter to decimeter scale.

The augen gneiss member consists of two belts of fine to medium grained gneiss bearing biotite, microcline, quartz, and plagioclase, with abundant large ovoids (augen) consisting of microcline and/or quartz.

The streaked-augen gneiss member consists of uniform, medium-grained biotite-microcline-quartz-plagioclase gneiss, with augen that have a "stretched" or "streaked" appearance.

The hornblende gneiss member is similar to the layered gneiss member, but with hornblende-bearing dark gneiss accounting for about half of the outcrop area.

The Slaughterhouse Gneiss weathers to a pinkish to orange color, and consists of relatively uniform, medium-grained microcline-quartz-plagioclase gneiss with muscovite, biotite, or both.

== Structure ==
Ellicott City Granite
Woodstock Granite
Baltimore Mafic Complex	Mt. Washington Complex
Baltimore Mafic Complex	Hollofield Formation
Baltimore Mafic Complex	Aberdeen Metagabbro
Baltimore Mafic Complex	Perry Hall Gneiss
Glenarm Group	Loch Raven Schist
Glenarm Group	Oella Formation
Glenarm Group	Cockeysville Marble
Glenarm Group	Setters Formation
Baltimore Gneiss
Rock units of the Baltimore Terrane in the central Maryland Piedmont Province.

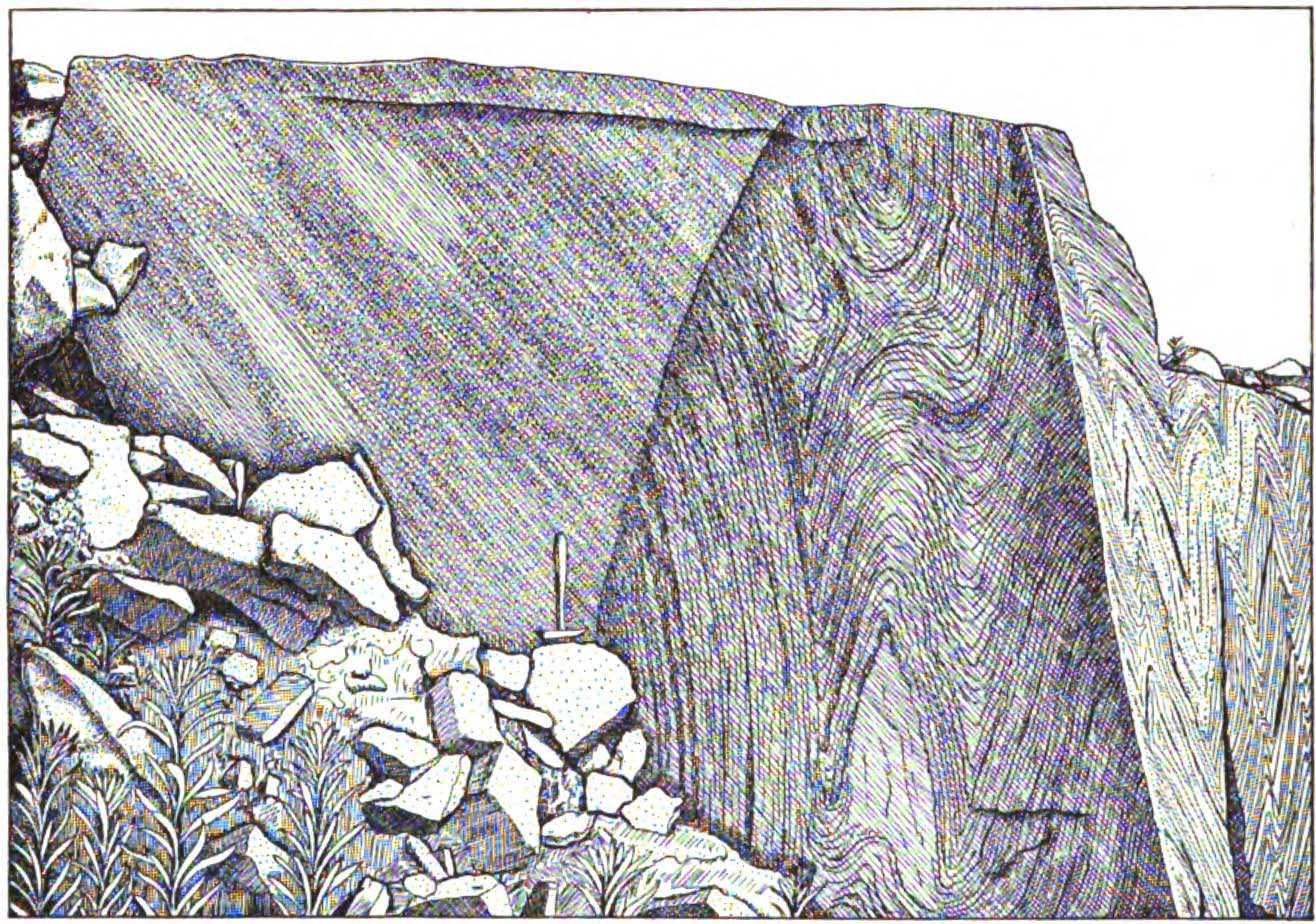
Illustration of an inclusion of the Baltimore Gneiss within the Woodstock Quartz Monzonite

The Phoenix, Texas, Chattalolanee, and Towson gneiss anticlines in the Baltimore, Maryland area are all part of a refolded nappe system beneath the Towson anticline. The cores of these nappes consist of the Baltimore Gneiss. The Baltimore Gneiss has been affected by three deformation periods: the Grenvillian, known from radiometric age data, for which nearly all resulting structural features where destroyed or obstructed by later tectonic deformation; the Taconic-Acadian, which involved three phases of folding, amphibolite facies metamorphism, local migmatization, and the development of the gneiss's pervasive structural elements; and the Alleghanian-Palisades, which resulted in predominantly brittle faulting and open folding. The cause of the Grenvillian deformation is uncertain. The Taconic-Acadian deformation was caused by the collision of an ocean floor/island arc terrane with a continental margin or fringing microcontinent in the early Paleozoic. The Alleghanian-Pallisades deformation was caused by continental rifting in the early Mesozoic, and possibly late-Paleozoic trans-current plate motions.

== History ==
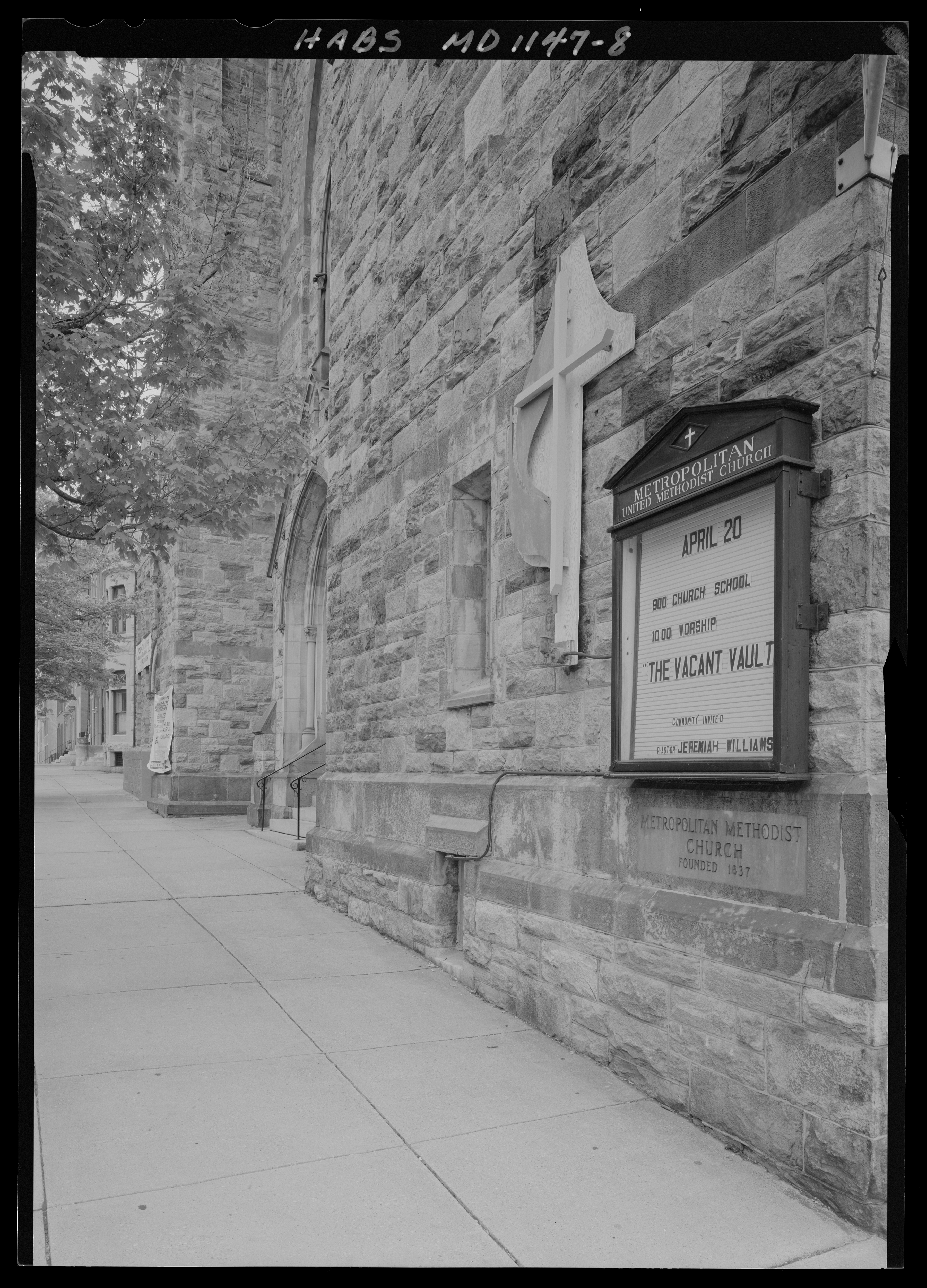
The Grace Methodist Episcopal Church in Baltimore City, an example of a building built in part from "Falls Road blue gneiss."

The name Baltimore Gneiss was first used by George Huntington Williams in 1892 to describe the variety of widely distributed gneisses in the Baltimore area.

=== Usage ===
The Baltimore Gneiss has been used in the past as building stone in the Baltimore area. It is thought that some of the first buildings built in Baltimore in the 1700s were constructed of gneiss quarried from Jones Falls. In addition to use in buildings, gneiss from Jones Falls and Gwynn Falls quarries was used for foundations, roads, and curbstones in Baltimore. Some quarrymen referred to the gneiss as "blue stone" due to the blue-gray color of its fresh surface. The last building stone quarry in Baltimore closed in 1958.

== Type localities ==
The type locality of the Baltimore Gneiss as described by William Patrick Crowley of the Maryland Geological Survey in 1976 is defined as outcrops along Towson Run from Bellona Avenue to Towsontown Boulevard. Formerly, the type locality was considered as referring to layered gneisses which outcrop along Jones Falls and Gwynns Falls in Baltimore City, however, chemical and textural analysis followed by zircon age measurements determined that these gneisses represent a distinct younger geologic unit.

The type locality of the layered gneiss member includes stream cuts along Herring Run for 255 meters on either side of Arlington Avenue bridge near Morgan State University.

The type locality of the augen gneiss member includes outcrops along Long Green Creek 385 meters southeast of Glenarm Road bridge.

The type locality of the streaked-augen gneiss member includes outcrops along Merryman Branch 125 meters upstream from the Dulaney Valley Road bridge.

The type locality of the hornblende gneiss member includes outcrops along an unnamed stream between Malvern Avenue and Boyce Avenue.

The type locality of the Slaughterhouse Gneiss outcrops along the Slaughterhouse Branch southeast of the Baltimore Beltway (I-695).

== Notable outcrops ==
Some notable exposures of the Baltimore Gneiss in addition to the type localities mentioned above include outcrops along the Rapids Trail in the McKeldin Area of Patapsco Valley State Park and along roads around the Loch Raven Reservoir.
