= Hugh Sisson =

American stonemason (1820-1893)

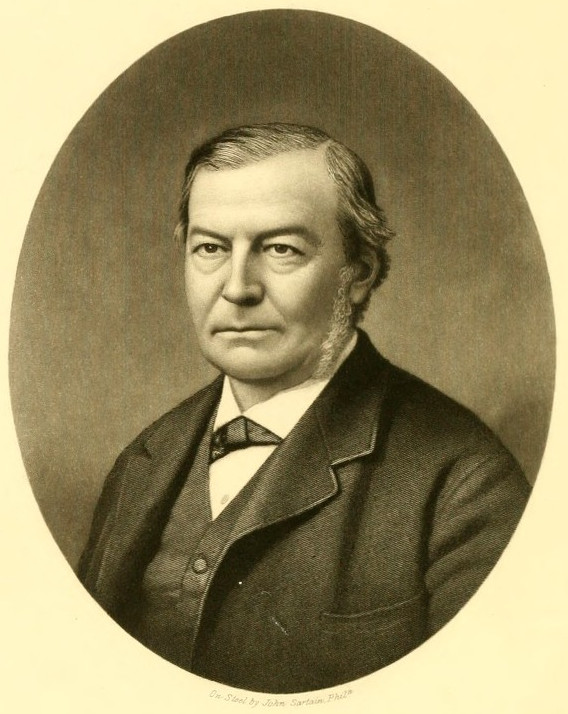
Hugh Sisson

Hugh Sisson III aka Marble King of Baltimore (May 3, 1820 – August 31, 1893) was a Baltimore, Maryland stone mason, whose work is found in much of the city's monumental architecture in the post-Civil War era. He established a business in Baltimore that grew into one of the largest and most technologically advanced operations of its kind on the East Coast. His firm, Hugh Sisson & Sons Steam Marble Works, was located at the corner of North Street and Monument Street. Sisson imported marble from Italy, the first in the city to do so, but also local marble could be just as good. He purchased quarries at Beaver Dam in Cockeysville, which produced stone of the highest quality known as Cockeysville Marble.

Sisson's firm was responsible for the stone and marble work on many of Baltimore’s significant structures. Examples include Baltimore City Hall, completed in 1875, where Sisson's firm was credited with all the interior marble work, including columns, floors, and ceilings. The mosaic floor in the public rotunda was especially noted for its craftsmanship. His firm also supplied the marble for the George Peabody Library, the granite for the bases of many prominent statues, and interiors of many institutions such as banks, insurance headquarters, post offices, and custom-houses. Beyond Baltimore, he was involved in the construction of many important buildings, such as the United States Capitol, where 108 large columns, each 26 feet in length, were furnished for the addition of the wings in the 1850s and 60s. The main General Post Office in Washington, and the Washington Monument (partial). The Drexel and Penn Mutual Insurance buildings in Philadelphia. The spires of St. Patrick's Cathedral in New York. He began work on the South Carolina State House, but was forced to abandon the project due to the outbreak of the Civil War.

Hugh Sisson was the stone mason responsible for the monument to Edgar Allan Poe's burial site in Baltimore. He actually created two versions. The first, a more modest headstone, was completed shortly after Poe's death. In a bizarre accident, the monument was awaiting shipment at Sisson's stone yard when a derailed train ran off the adjacent tracks and demolished it. Lacking the money for a replacement, the project was delayed for nearly 25 years. Finally, after a new fundraising effort succeeded, Sisson was commissioned to build the grander monument that stands at Poe's reburial site today, which was completed in 1875.

Poe's grave is probably Sisson's most visited today, but the Sisson name can be found inscribed on monuments throughout the Green Mount Cemetery, the premier cemetery of Baltimore in the 19th century. Sisson's best known works there include the ornate tomb of A. S. Abell, founder of the Baltimore Sun, and the sarcophagus for Betsy (Elizabeth) Patterson Bonaparte. He also produced and signed the marker to the first burial in Green Mount. Green Mount features numerous markers depicting sleeping children, including a work considered the most important American sculpture on this theme, William Henry Rinehart's Sleeping Children, a monument for Sisson's own children. Sisson lost five children to childhood mortality. Acting as a friend and patron, he commissioned Sleeping Children in 1859 from Rinehart for the Sisson family lot.

Sisson Street, in the Remington neighborhood of Baltimore City, is named for him.
