= Setters Formation =

Geological formation in the northeastern U.S.

- Stratigraphic range: late Precambrian
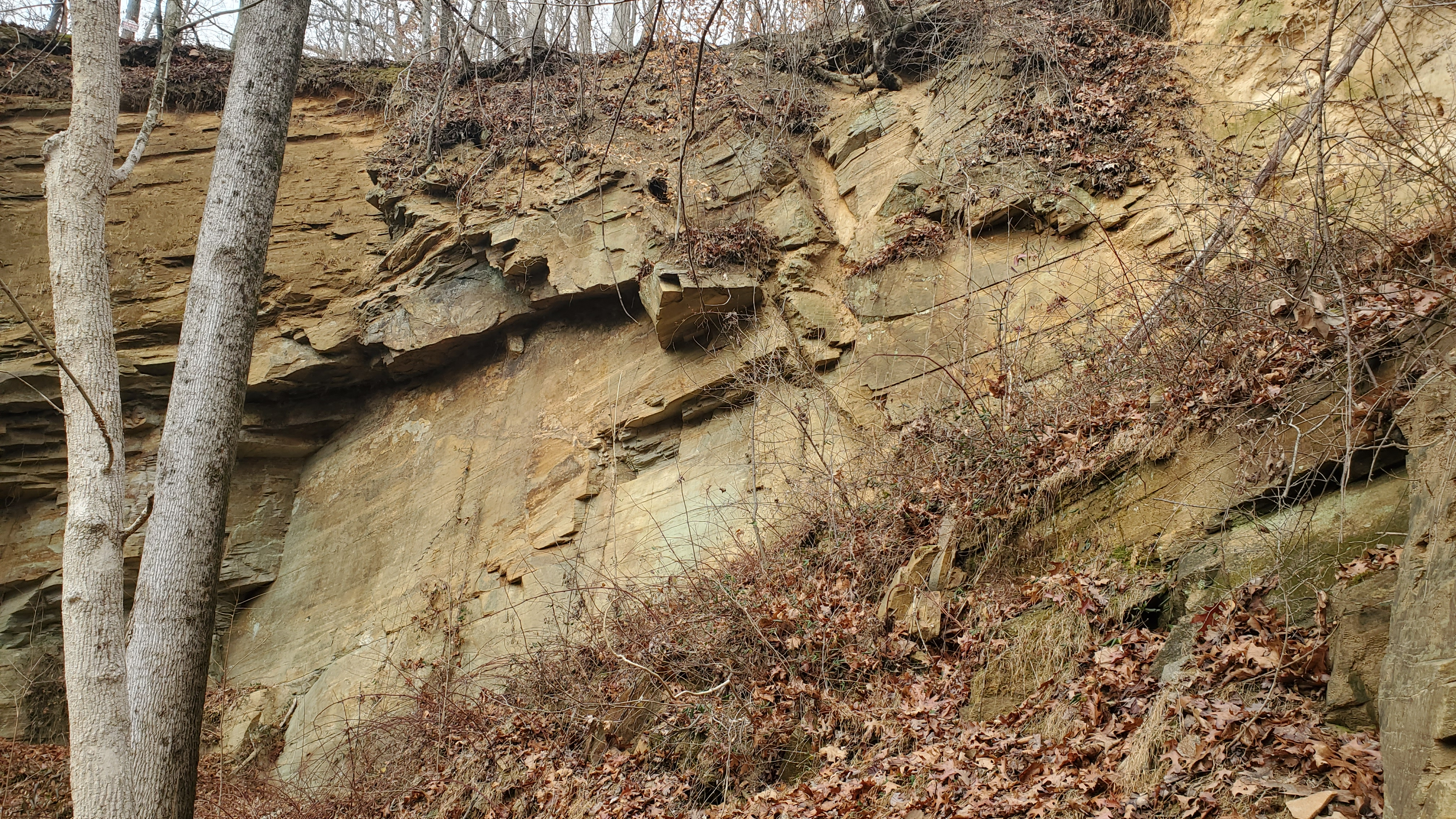
- Outcrop of Setters Formation along Marriottsville Road, Baltimore County
- Type: metamorphic
- Unit of: Glenarm Group
- Underlies: Cockeysville Marble
- Overlies: Baltimore Gneiss

Lithology
- Primary: Mica-schist
- Other: Muscovite-gneiss and quartzite

Location
- Region: Piedmont of eastern North America
- Country: United States
- Extent: Maryland, Pennsylvania, Delaware

The Setters Formation is a geological formation that is located in Maryland, Pennsylvania, and Delaware in the United States. The formation is metamorphic and consists of a complex suite of schist, gneiss, and quartzite.

It is the lowest unit of the Glenarm Group (or Supergroup). The overlying formations of the group are the Cockeysville Marble and the Wissahickon Formation.

== Outcrops ==
Some outcrops listed by the USGS are:

- Setters Ridge, which forms north front of Chattolanee anticline, Baltimore County, Maryland.
- Quarries in Avondale, Pennsylvania.
- Eastburn's quarry, New Castle County, Delaware.

== Gallery ==
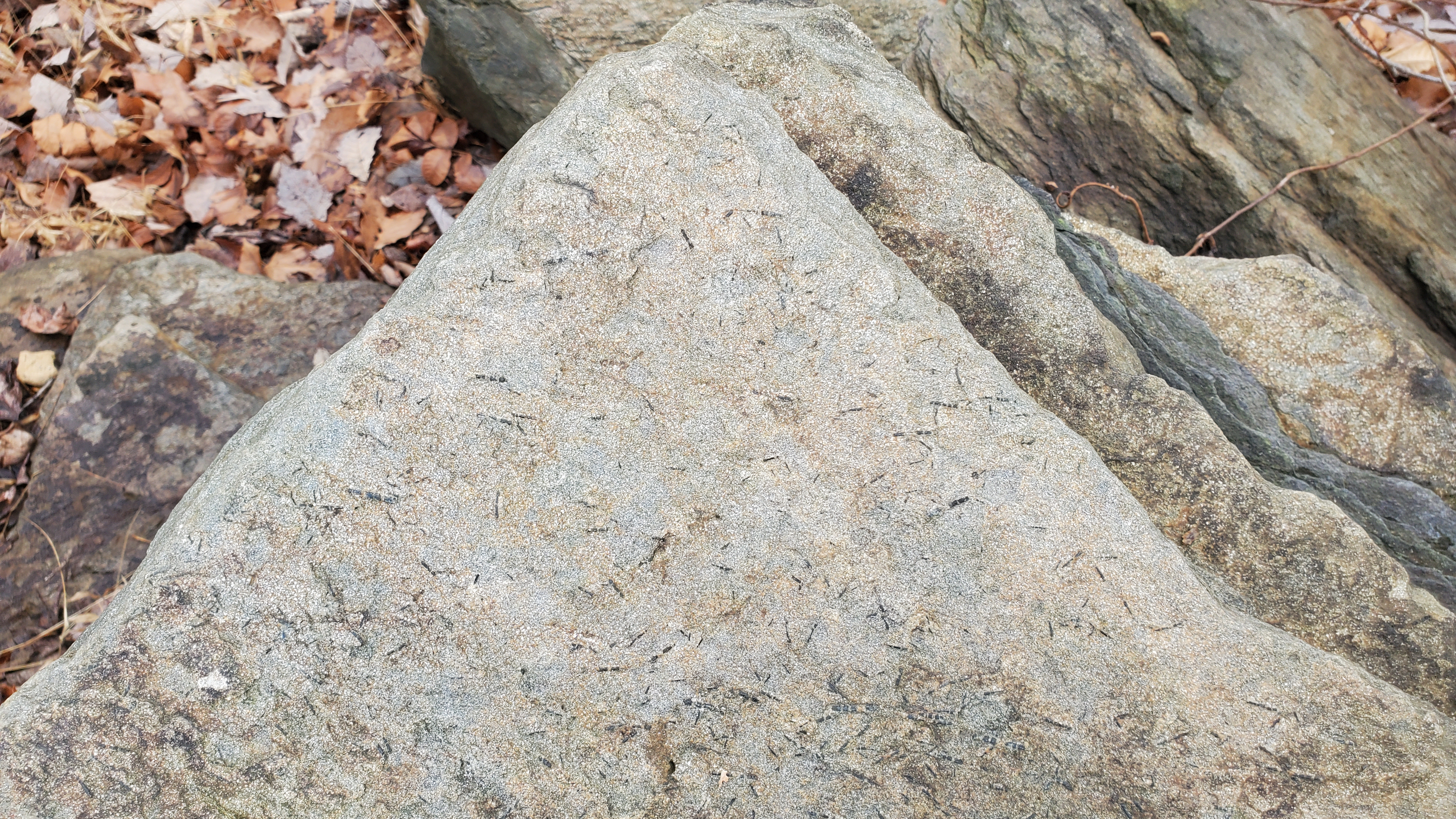
Setters Formation showing schist with tourmaline or hornblende crystals on the foliation plane
