= Baltimore County School No. 7 =

Historic school building in Maryland

- U.S. National Register of Historic Places
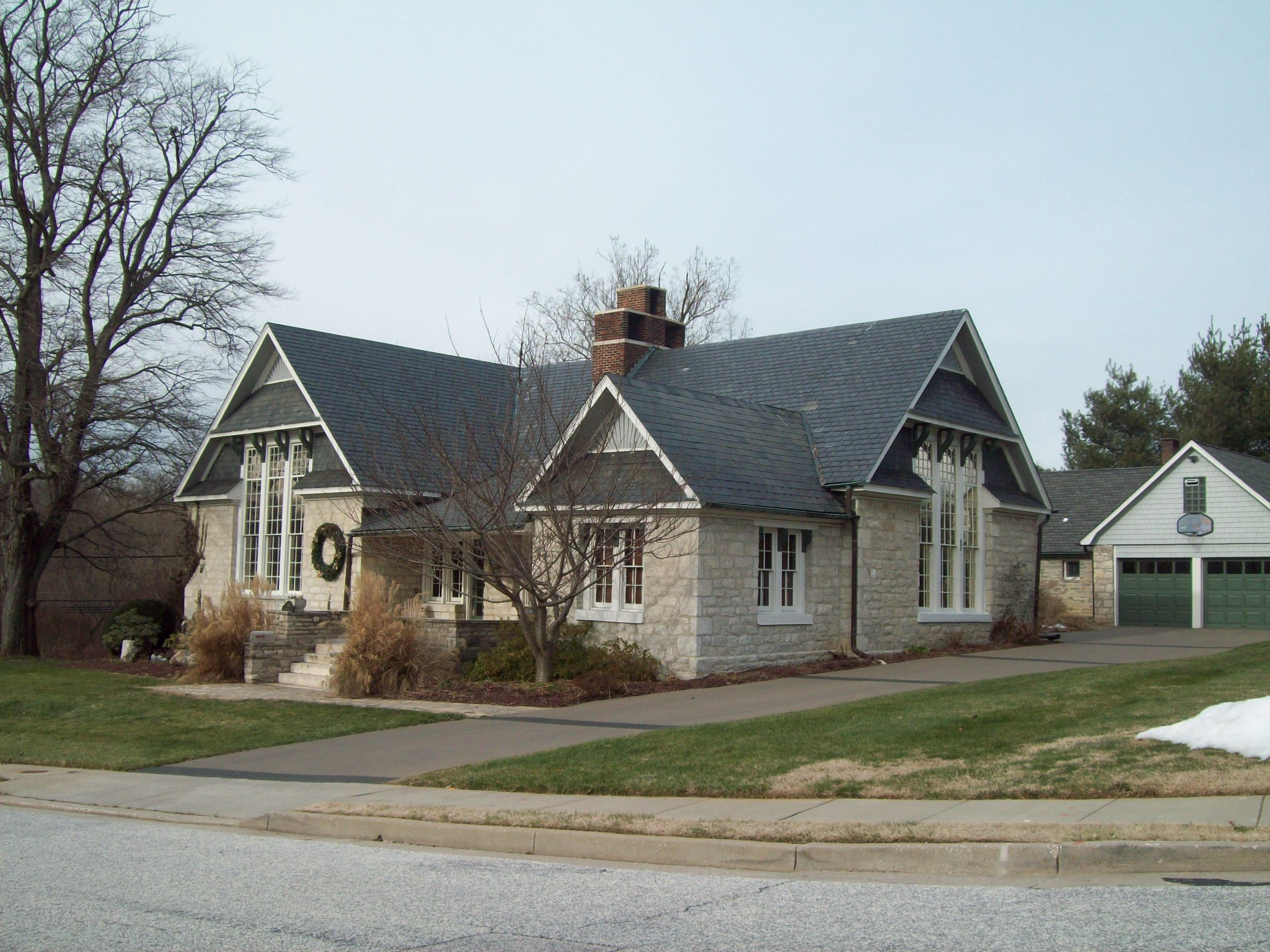
- Baltimore County School No. 7, December 2009

- Location within Maryland Location within the United States
- Location: 200 Ashland Rd., Cockeysville, Maryland
- Coordinates: 39°29′43.4″N 76°38′30.6″W
- Area: 1 acre (0.40 ha)
- Built: 1882
- Architects: Davis, Frank E.; Merryman, Robert G.
- Architectural style: Queen Anne
- NRHP reference No.: 00001007
- Added to NRHP: August 31, 2000

Baltimore County School No. 7, also known as Ashland School, is a historic school building located at Cockeysville, Baltimore County, Maryland. It was constructed in 1882 at the entrance to the village of Ashland. It was associated with the Ashland Iron Works. It is built of rough cut marble ashlar from a nearby quarry. The exterior reflects the influence of the Queen Anne style with gabled windows, elaborate cornice work, fan-shaped attic vents at the roof peak, and numerous large banks of multi-pained windows. Originally a two-room schoolhouse, it was converted into a private residence in 1930.

It was listed on the National Register of Historic Places in 2000.
