= Jones Falls =

Stream in Maryland

Coordinates: 39°20′7.5″N 76°38′44.8″W

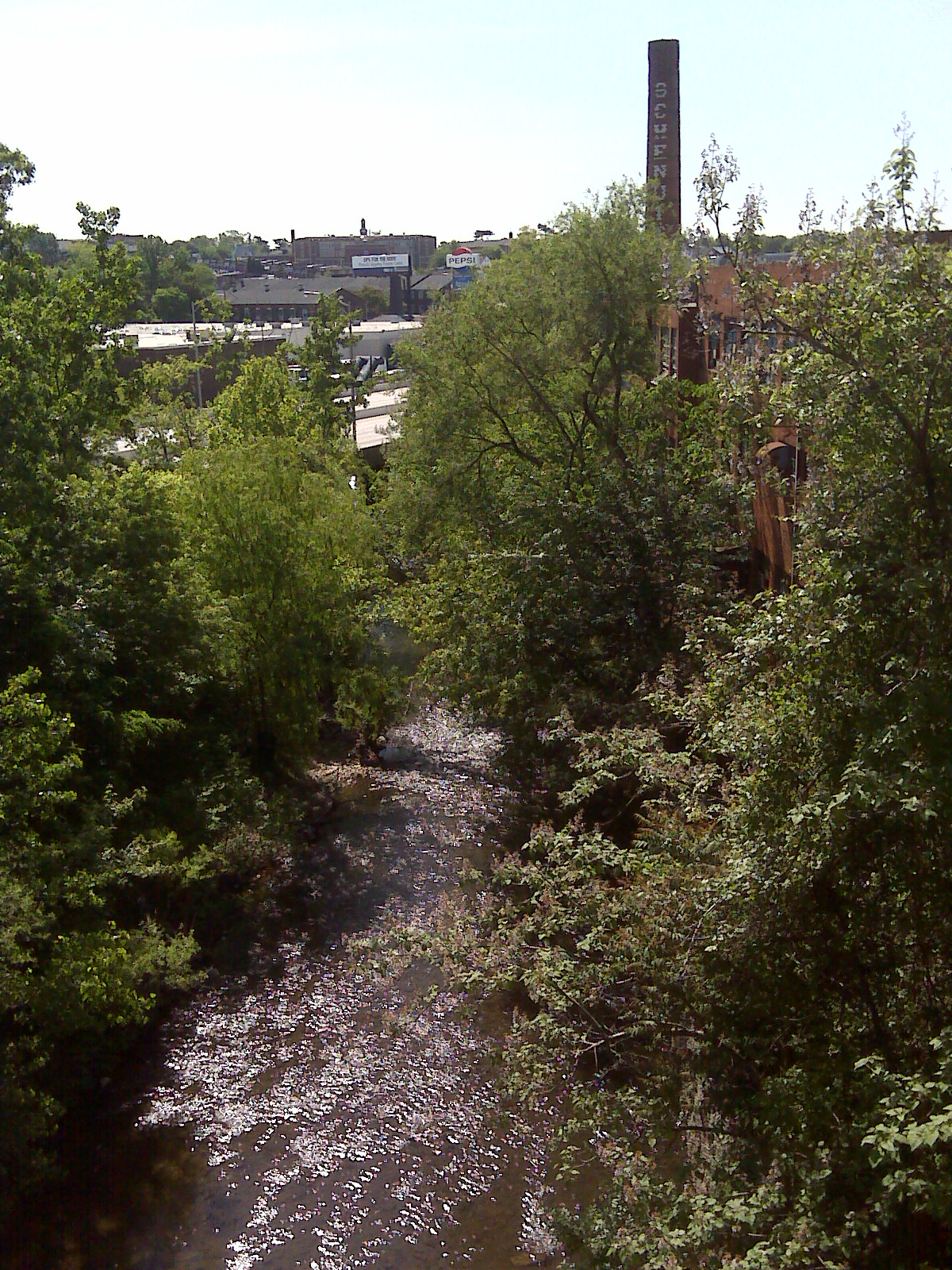
- A view of the Jones Falls from the 41st Street bridge, which crosses the valley. The JFX (Jones-Falls Expressway) is also visible in the center of the picture.

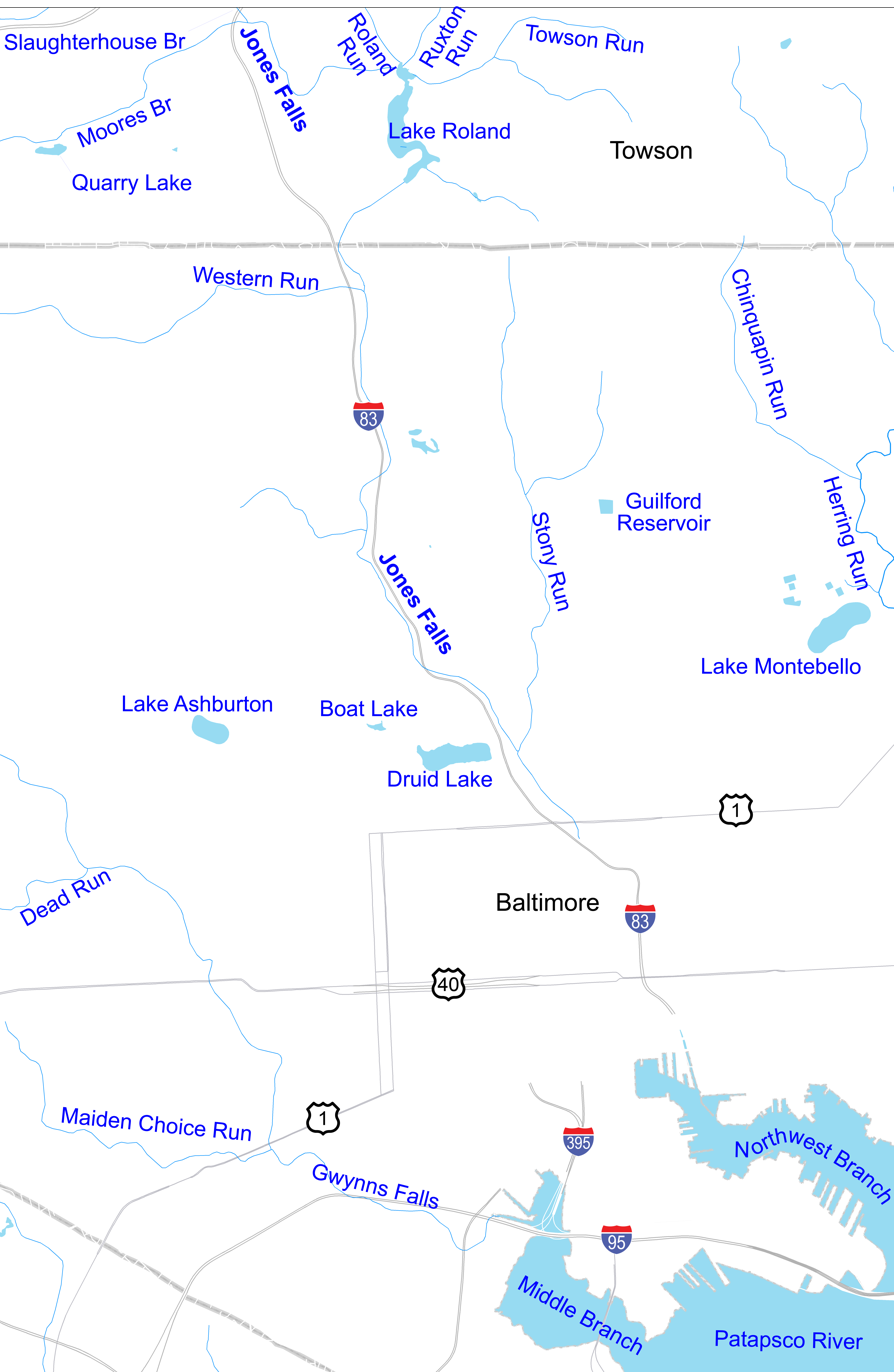
- A map of the Jones Falls watershed in Baltimore

Location
- Country: United States
- State: Maryland
- City: Baltimore

Physical characteristics
- Mouth: Baltimore Inner Harbor
  - location: Baltimore, Maryland, United States

Basin features
- Tributaries
  - left: Towson Run, Roland Run
  - right: Western Run, Moores Branch

The Jones Falls is a 17.9-mile-long (28.8 km) stream in Maryland. It is impounded to create Lake Roland before running through the city of Baltimore and finally emptying into the Baltimore Inner Harbor.

The Jones Falls valley has a long history in the city of Baltimore as a transportation corridor. The valley of the Jones Falls carries Falls Road (which is numbered as Maryland Route 25), the tracks for the Amtrak Northeast Corridor, the Jones Falls Expressway (JFX) of Interstate 83, and the Baltimore Light Rail. The Baltimore Penn Station also rests on an elevated platform in the valley. It also carries tracks for a historic rail line which is currently served by the Baltimore Streetcar Museum. The MTA Maryland Route 27 also provides transportation on Falls Road; however, at some point it was moved from following 36th Street south to other city streets.

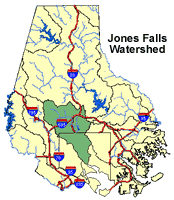
Map of the entire Jones Falls River Watershed

The Jones Falls is spanned by many bridges within Baltimore City's borders, and often the Jones Falls Expressway rests directly above the river.

== Course ==
The Jones Falls begins as a small stream in Baltimore County near Garrison at the intersection of Caves and Garrison Road (39.41771° -76.75750°). It travels southeast for 3.3 miles (5.3 km) before joining the North Branch Jones Falls stream near Stevenson (39.41225° -76.70937°). North Branch Jones Falls originates near Worthington by the intersection of Park Heights Avenue and Walnut Avenue (39.46135° -76.75057°). The North Branch travels south for 5.2 miles (8.4 km) before joining Jones Falls stream. The falls then travels east for 1.3 miles (2.1 km) before Dipping Pond Run joins at ( 39.41424° -76.68557°). The Jones Falls continues east another 0.8 miles (1.3 km) before Deep Run intersects near Brooklandville (39.41467° -76.67060°). The stream then continues south along Interstate 83 (I-83), which is named the Jones Falls Expressway, for 1.7 miles (2.7 km) until Slaughterhouse Branch and Moores Branch join it next to the I-83 overpass over Maryland Route 25 (MD 25, Falls Road) (39.39587° -76.66442°).

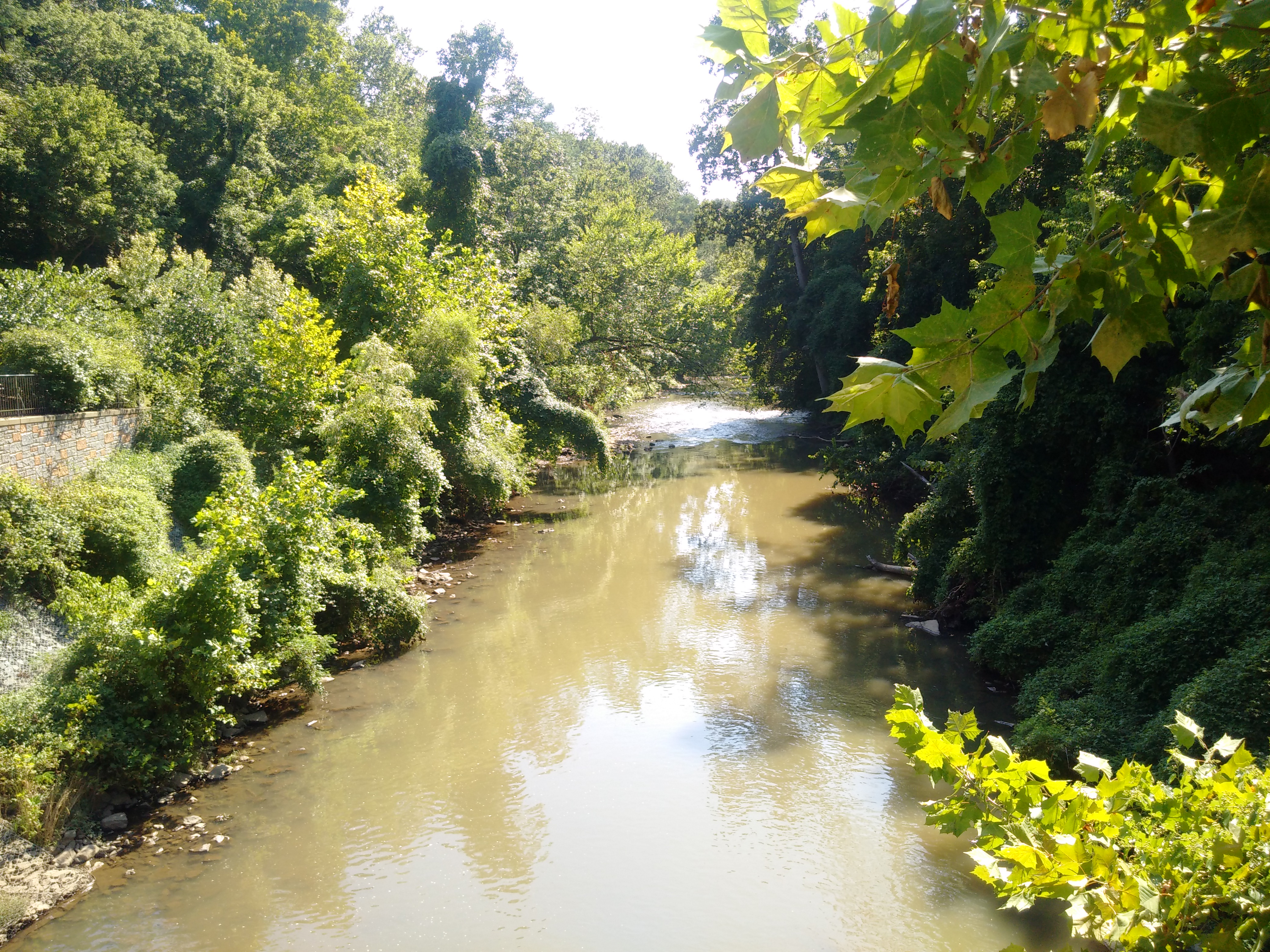
Jones Falls just downstream of the Lake Roland dam

The Jones Falls travels southeast for 1.5 miles (2.4 km), passing through Lake Roland Park, until it meets Lake Roland, an impounding of the stream. (39.39069° -76.64639°) In Lake Roland, Roland Run and Towson Run both join. Once it leaves Lake Roland, the Jones Falls becomes a small river.

Not long after leaving the lake, the Jones Falls enters Baltimore directly underneath an intersection of Interstate 83 and the Baltimore Light Rail's mainline, with both routes beginning to parallel I-83. For the remainder of the Jones Falls' course, I-83 enters the Jones Falls valley, where it constantly crosses over, parallels, and covers the river. Another 1/2 mile (800 m) after entering the city, Western Run joins near Mount Washington (39.36717° -76.64835°). The Jones Falls, I-83, and the Light Rail continue south for 4.4 miles (7.1 km) before the last major stream, Stony Run, empties into the stream near Druid Hill Park (39.31683° -76.62672°). Along the way, MD 25 enters the valley, running parallel to the river opposite of the highway and rail lines. MD 25 is also paralleled by the Jones Falls Trail. About a 1/4 mile (400 m) before it intersects Stony Run, the Jones Falls goes over a 10 feet (3 m) waterfall named "Round Falls".

About 0.6 miles (1 km) after Stony Run, and after passing by the Baltimore Streetcar Museum, the CSXT-operated Baltimore Belt Line bridges the river, bound for the Howard Street Tunnel. The Jones Falls then immediately passes underneath North Avenue. Just south of North Avenue, the Amtrak Northeast Corridor enters the valley upon exiting the Baltimore and Potomac Tunnel and bridging the Jones Falls, with Howard Street Bridge directly above this intersection. MD 25 ends shortly after (splitting into the one-way couplet of eastbound Lanvale Street and westbound Lafayette Avenue), with the Jones Falls Trail joining city streets, and the Light Rail also leaves the valley to join Howard Street. After the rapid succession of bridges, the Jones Falls almost immediately enters a tunnel, the Jones Falls Conduit, which curves to flow directly underneath I-83 (39.30896° -76.61964°). After passing by Baltimore's Pennsylvania Station, situated directly in the valley, the Northeast Corridor exits the valley, and the Jones Falls Conduit and I-83 curve sharply to the south. The river and highway continue to Fayette Street. Here, I-83 ends; two blocks south of this point, the Jones Falls exits the conduit and flows several more blocks before it empties into the east side of the Inner Harbor (39.28657° -76.60457°) near Mr. Trash Wheel.

== Future ==
As far back as 1990, city-sponsored planning studies showed support for the idea of partially demolishing I-83 and thus daylighting the Jones Falls. More recent suggestions include a long-range plan proposed by Marc Szarkowski, while he was working for the Philadelphia firm Dremodeling, and a more immediate and concrete plan commissioned by the city from Baltimore-based Rummel, Klepper & Kahl in 2009.

The Szarkowski vision is wide ranging, including infill housing, an expansion of Penn Station, a system of roundabouts, a multi-story sculpture and several new, buried transit lines. Szarkowski has publicly acknowledged the extremely ambitious and long-range nature of the plan.

The RK&K study was more limited, assessing only the area from Fayette Street to Chase Street. The long-range Szarkowski concept includes selected portions of the watershed from as far north as Woodberry, though with significantly less engineering detail included.

A civic group, Friends of the Jones Falls, is active in advocating for the daylighting of the river.

== Legal issues ==
On April 5, 2023, Blue Water Baltimore, a nonprofit environmental advocacy group, filed a lawsuit against the Kerry Group, the parent of Fleishmann's Vinegar Co., the nation's largest vinegar manufacturer. The company was accused of polluting the water channels in Jones Falls with illegal acidic chemicals, causing around 1,000 fish to die beginning in 2021. The lawsuit also stated that the members of Blue Water Baltimore discovered dead fish and eels in the water streams, illegal chemicals pumping out from unauthorized extra pipes on the property into the Jones Falls stream, and various highly acidic toxins around the foundation of the plant. The Maryland Department of the Environment also filed its own lawsuit through the U.S. District Court of Baltimore the same day. Reportedly, the company bypassed safety requirements when discharging treated water into the stream to cool down the vinegar, including the removal of chlorine. Additionally, according to an inspection by state regulators, they had discharged more than 643,300 gallons of water into the stream per day, which was more than double the amount of the company's original estimation of 295,000 gallons.

In December 2023, as a result of the lawsuits, Kerry shut down Fleischmann's Baltimore plant. The announcement of the shutdown came the same day as environmental testing at the facility from the state was planned to commence. A spokesperson for Kerry stated that “The company will transfer production from Baltimore to other facilities as part of a broader consolidation of activity within the network,”. The company did not comment on if there were any layoffs caused by the shutdown, but they did not file layoff notices with the Maryland Department of Labor. A test from the Maryland Department of the Environment conducted on Dec. 20, 2023 found that a small amount of green dye was visible in Jones Falls just below the back wall of the facility. Earlier that day, Maryland environmental officials stated that red and green dye might be seen in the Jones Falls waters, however this was not said to pose a threat to life.

== See also ==
- List of rivers in Maryland
