= Stone Hall (Cockeysville, Maryland) =

Historic house in Maryland, United States

- U.S. National Register of Historic Places
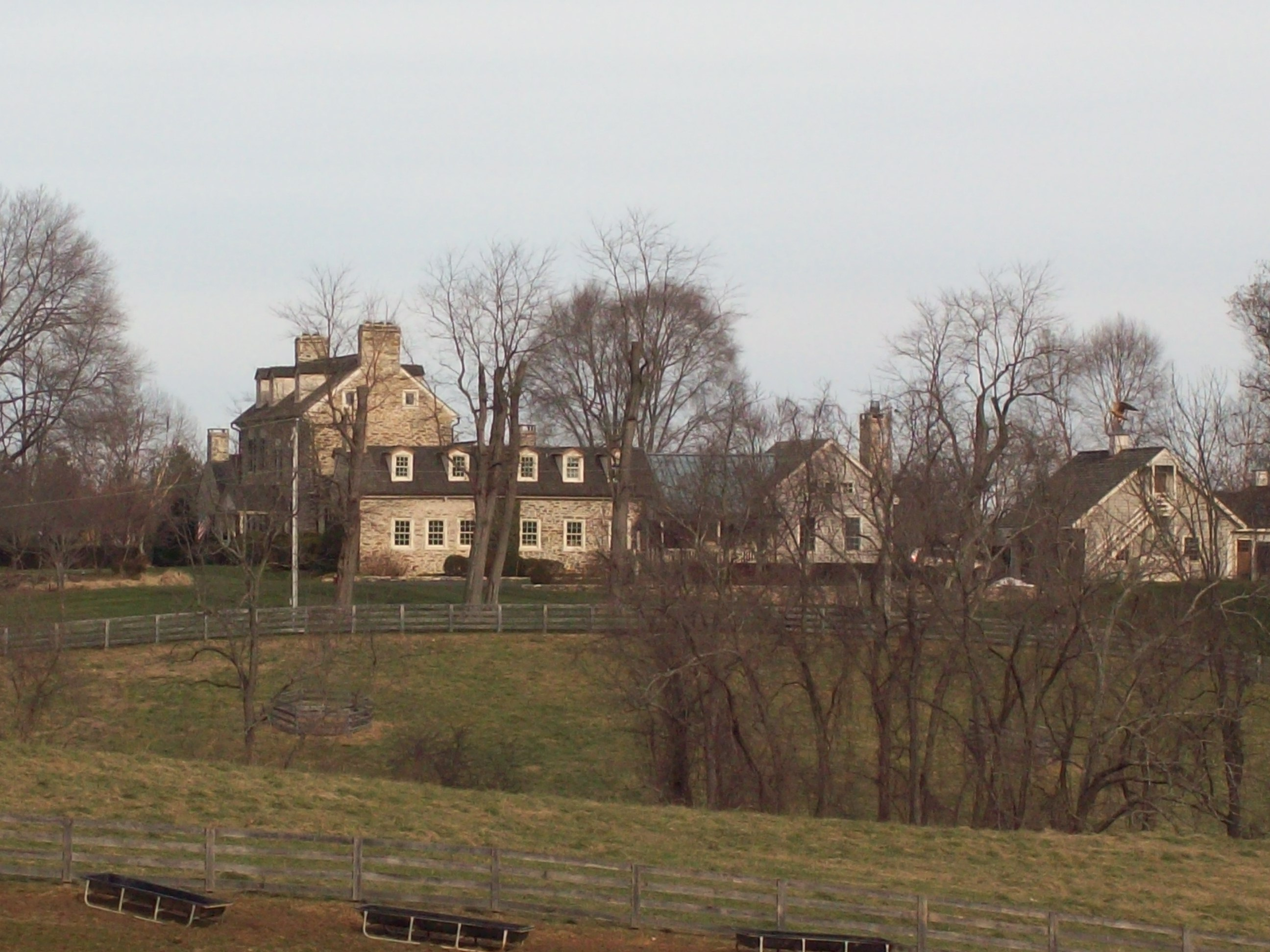
- Stone Hall, December 2009

- Location within Maryland Location within the United States
- Nearest city: Cockeysville, Maryland
- Coordinates: 39°30′34″N 76°41′58″W
- Area: 82 acres (33 ha)
- Built: 1783
- Architectural style: Federal
- NRHP reference No.: 73000900
- Added to NRHP: July 26, 1973

Stone Hall is a historic home in Cockeysville, Maryland, United States. It is a manor house set on a 248-acre (1.00 km^{2}) estate that was originally part of a 4,200-acre (17 km^{2}) tract called Nicholson's Manor. It was patented by William Nicholson of Kent County, Maryland, in 1719. The property in what is now known as the Worthington Valley was split up in 1754 and sold in 1050-acre lots to Roger Boyce, Corbin Lee, Brian Philpot, and Thinsey Johns.

The house known as Stone Hall was built on the 360-acre plantation bought by Thomas Gent, in 1775 from Philpot. Gent served as a colonel in the Baltimore Militia during the Revolutionary War.

The house was built in four sections beginning in the late eighteenth century: the initial stage consisted of a 1 1/2-story fieldstone structure built before 1783; the north and south wings were added between 1783 and 1798; and the 2 1/2-story, gable-roofed, fieldstone main block at the north end. During the later years as a working plantation in the antebellum period, the 1 1/2-story structure was likely used as a separate kitchen. Other outbuildings would have included slave quarters. Many of these were likely kept after emancipation to be used by sharecroppers.

The last section of the mansion, a 1 1/2-story fieldstone addition, was built about 1930, probably after the property was bought by Garnet and Salina Hulings. Also on the property is a barn, carriage house, and a blacksmith shop.

The house was listed on the National Register of Historic Places in 1973.
