= Towson Run =

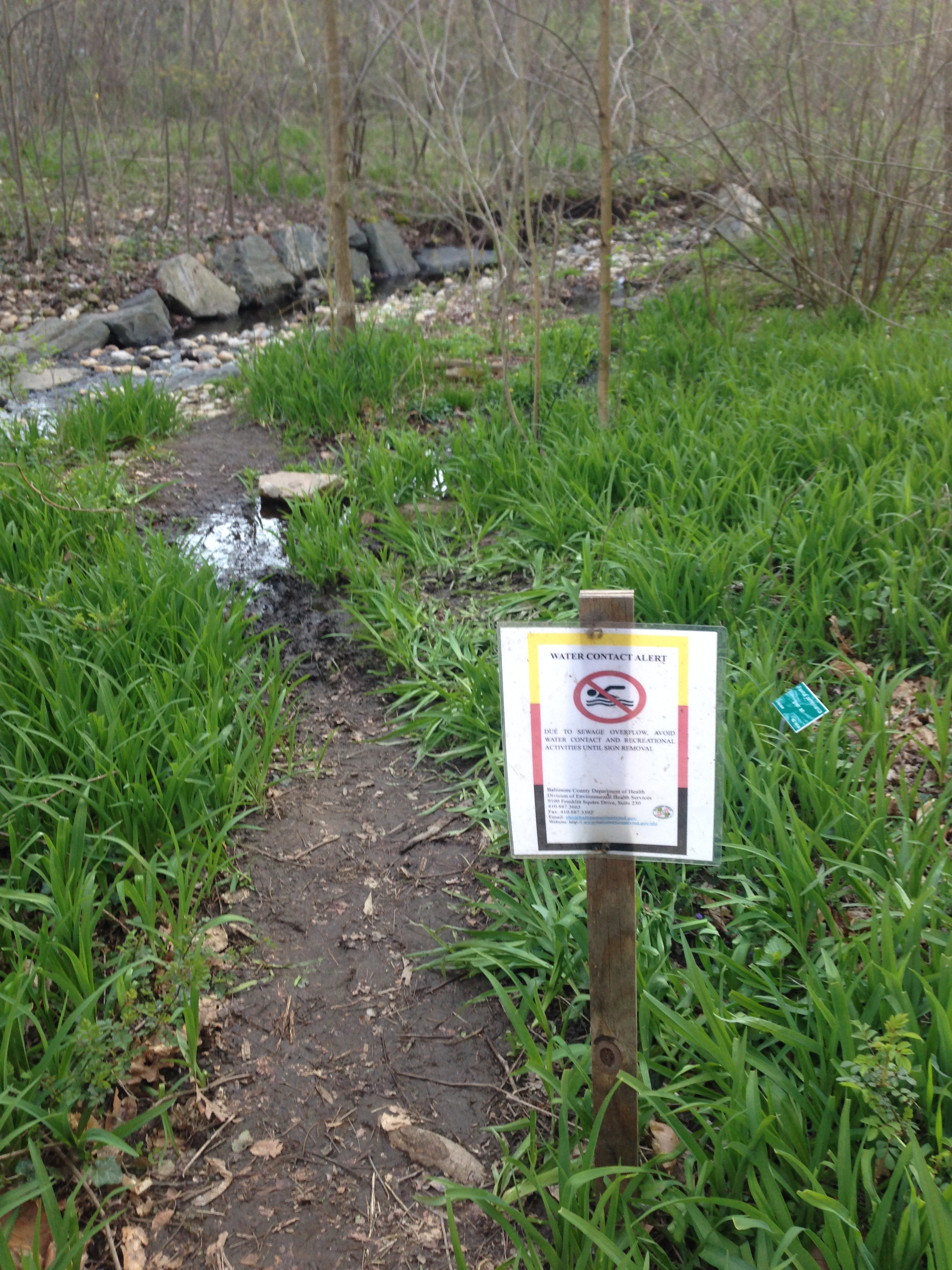
- A portion of Towson Run meanders into Glen Woods on the campus of Towson University.

Location
- Country: United States
- State: Maryland
- County: Baltimore County

Physical characteristics
- Source
  - location: Baltimore County, Maryland, United States
- Mouth
  - location: Baltimore County, Maryland, United States
  - coordinates: 39°23′22″N 76°38′35″W

Towson Run is a tributary of Jones Falls, a stream in Baltimore County, Maryland, in the United States. The stream runs north through Sheppard Pratt and Towson University, near the communities of Rodgers Forge and Armagh Village.

== Geology ==
The type locality of the Baltimore Gneiss outcrops along Towson Run from Bellona Avenue to Towsontown Boulevard.
