= Beaver Dam (Maryland) =

Marble quarry in Cockeysville, Maryland

Coordinates: 39°28′44″N 76°39′25″W

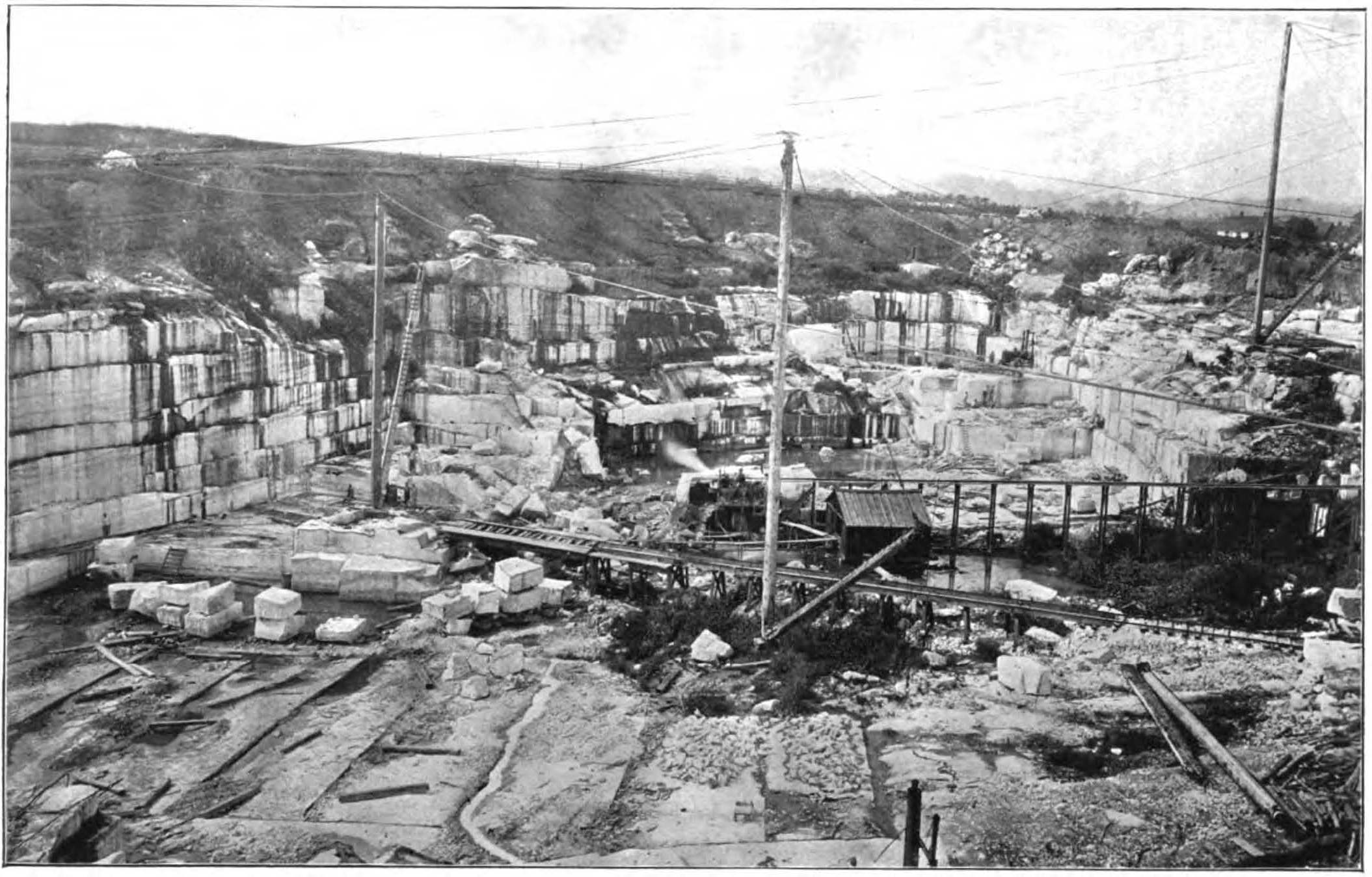
The Beaver Dam Quarry, c. 1898

Beaver Dam is a former marble quarry in Cockeysville, Maryland, that was a source of stone for many notable buildings in the United States, including the United States Capitol and the Washington Monument. Flooded since the 1930s, the site is now a local swimming and recreational club. While there were dozens of small, abandoned quarries with various owners in the area — collectively known as the "Beaver Dam quarries" — the large quarry pit that is now a lake was the principal one. It has been called Maryland's "most celebrated building-stone quarry."

== Quarry ==
The dolomitic marble is known to geologists as Cockeysville Marble. It was considered some of the finest quality in the world according to government experts, noted for its purity of color and hardness suitable for building material and monuments. Benjamin Latrobe ranked the Cockeysville stone over Italian Carrara marble. With the popularity of Greek Revival buildings in the 19th century, the hard white marble from the quarry was highly sought after.

The quarries began around 1800 with mostly Irish immigrants employing hand drills, hammers, and chisels. Stone was loaded onto wagons and pulled by oxen to the nearby Northern Central Railway in Cockeysville. The quarry site was connected to a rail spur in around 1866 to facilitate moving the massive columns for the expansion of the United States Capitol. In 1873, workers erected a marble finishing building adjacent to the quarry: it is now listed with the Maryland Historic Trust and located across the street on a separate property. In 1878, Hugh Sisson ("Marble King of Baltimore"), acquired the property and other surrounding quarries and began using the latest technology of machine-powered derricks, shovels, and diamond bit drills, significantly increasing production.

Major architectural projects that used monolithic marble directly sourced from the Beaver Dam quarry include the United States Capitol's 108 large columns, each 26 feet in length, on the wings of the capitol completed in 1868; the Washington Monument's upper 390 feet; Baltimore City Hall (exterior); the Russell Senate Office Building in DC; the Maryland State House in Annapolis (exterior columns); monolithic columns were manufactured for the Baltimore Courthouse, and completed in 1900 as the largest columns in America at the time; the Albright-Knox Art Gallery in Buffalo, New York; and the Fisher Building in Detroit, which in 1929, represented the largest marble contract ever made. The dam at nearby Loch Raven Reservoir is constructed of stone from Beaver Dam quarry. For many other notable buildings, the stone is only identified as being "Cockeysville Marble" or coming from Baltimore County (Hannibal 2020 for a comprehensive list). While the specific quarry is unknown in these cases, it could have come from the Beaver Dam quarry. Marble was also used in numerous homes, businesses, and cemeteries, including Baltimore's iconic rowhouse marble steps.

About a half mile south lies Texas Quarry, a large active quarry operated by Martin Marietta. It is located in the former town of Texas, Maryland, which later merged into Cockeysville. Texas Quarry is of a similar age to the Beaver Dam quarries and was also a major producer of building marble. Its most notable use was for the Washington Monument, where a visible difference in the stone reveals the two quarries' distinct contributions. The whiter marble of the monument's bottom 152 feet came from Texas Quarry, while the warmer-toned marble of the next 390 feet is from Beaver Dam quarry. Today, Texas Quarry primarily produces aggregates such as gravel.

== Lake ==
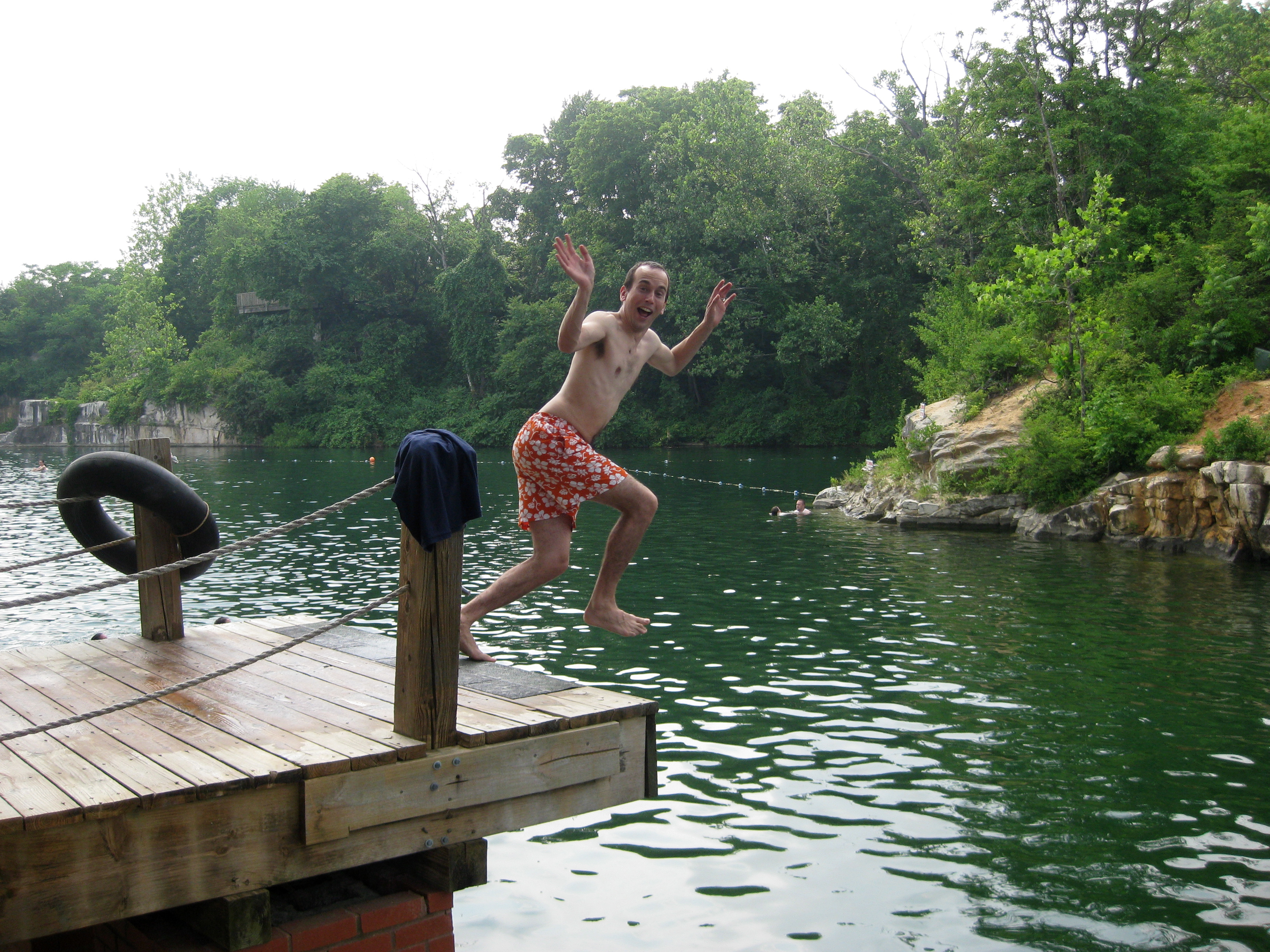
Beaver Dam lake today is a recreational destination.

A natural inflow of groundwater inundated the Beaver Dam quarry, exceeding 100,000 gallons a day, which required considerable pumping to keep the pit empty. When the quarry business slowed in the 1920s and declined around the time of the Great Depression, the owners stopped pumping. The original northern portion of the quarry (next to Beaver Dam Rd) filled to about 90-feet, and the newer southern portion to about 40-feet deep.

In 1936 it was repurposed as a swim club. The 30-acre Beaver Dam Swim Club was originally leased by Mark P. Hanley and the property was purchased by him after World War II. The same family has run the club since its founding (as of 2007). The buildings and additional pools added around 1950 do not date to the period of the quarry. The quarry-lake features floating platforms, rolling logs, diving boards, and a rope swing. The club includes two swimming pools, a volleyball court, and picnic areas, most of which were built in the 1950s. None are considered historic by the state.

Beaver Dam Run, a natural stream on its way to the Loch Raven Reservoir, flows through the property. It runs alongside the eastern edge of the spring-fed quarry lake.
