= Deep Run (Jones Falls) =

Sample river geobox for sandbox

Location
- Country: United States
- State: Maryland
- County: Baltimore County

Physical characteristics
- Source
  - location: Baltimore County, Maryland, United States
  - coordinates: 39°27′5″N 76°40′19″W
- Mouth
  - location: Baltimore County, Maryland, United States
  - coordinates: 39°24′52″N 76°40′14″W
  - elevation: 276 ft (84 m)

Deep Run (Earth)
Deep Run (the United States)
Deep Run (Maryland)

Deep Run is a tributary of Jones Falls a stream in Baltimore County, Maryland, in the United States.
