= Cockeysville, Maryland =

- Census-designated place
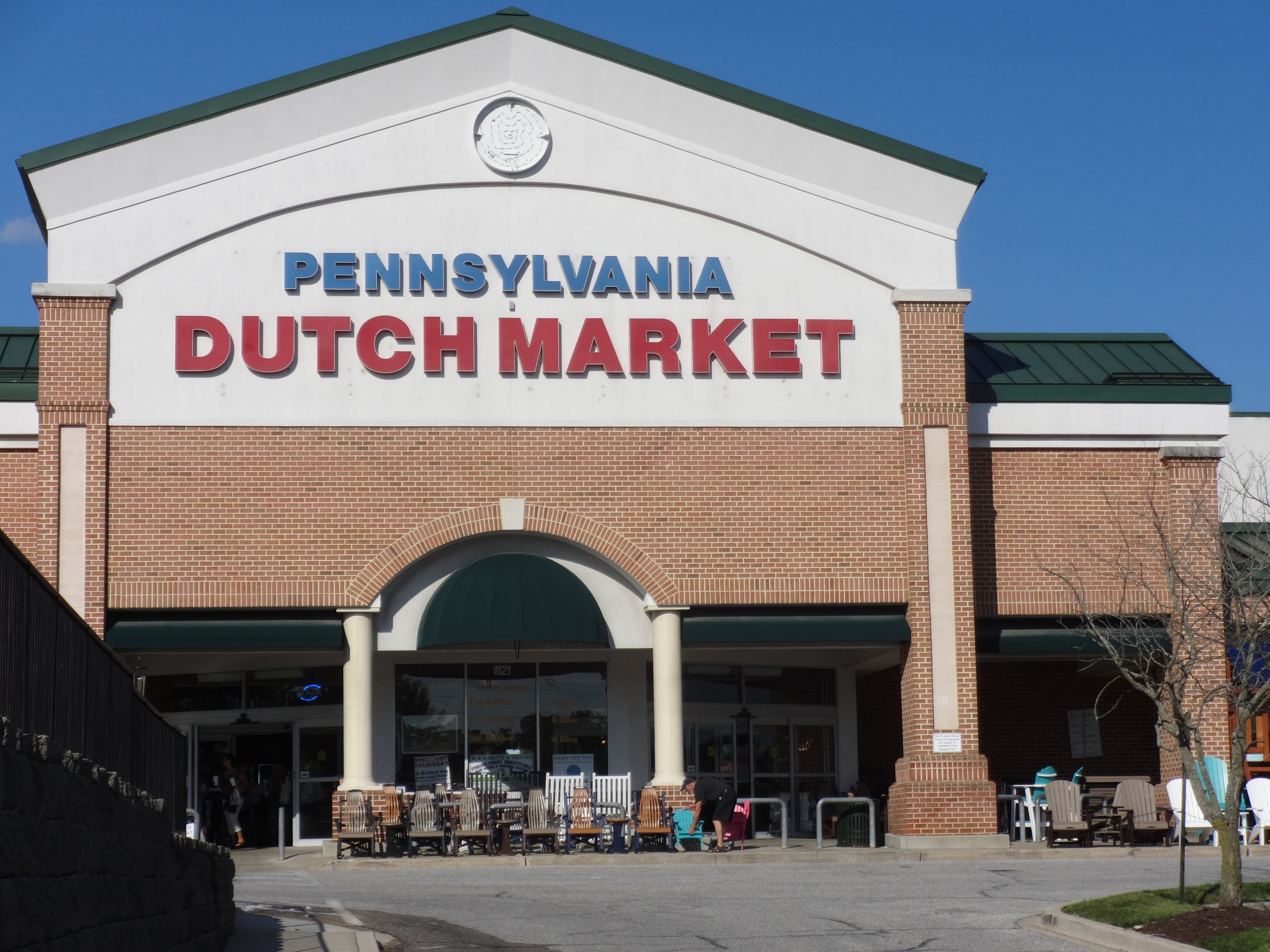
- Pennsylvania Dutch Market;

- Location of Cockeysville in Maryland
- Coordinates: 39°28′24″N 76°37′36″W
- Country: United States
- State: Maryland
- County: Baltimore

Area
  - Total: 12.38 sq mi (32.06 km^{2})
  - Land: 11.97 sq mi (31.01 km^{2})
  - Water: 0.40 sq mi (1.04 km^{2})
- Elevation: 308 ft (94 m)

Population (2020)
  - Total: 24,184
  - Density: 2,020/sq mi (779.8/km^{2})
- Time zone: UTC−5 (Eastern (EST))
  - Summer (DST): UTC−4 (EDT)
- ZIP Codes: 21030, 21031, 21065
- Area codes: 410, 443, and 667
- FIPS code: 24-18250
- GNIS feature ID: 0589994

Cockeysville is a census-designated place (CDP) in Baltimore County, Maryland, United States. The population was 20,776 at the 2010 census.

== History ==
=== Natural ===
The low-lying valleys in and around Cockeysville are underlain by a soft, crystalline metamorphic rock called Cockeysville Marble. This rock, which was once limestone at the bottom of an ancient sea, erodes much faster than the surrounding harder schist. This process created fertile, rolling valleys with rich, lime-sweetened soils. These valleys supported mature hardwood forests. Dominant tree species would have included tulip poplar, American chestnut, various oaks (white, red, black), hickories, black walnut, and American elm. The understory would have had flowering shrubs and herbaceous plants like pawpaw, spicebush, mayapple, Virginia bluebells, and various ferns. Large mammals such as white-tailed deer, elk, and black bears were abundant. The area was also home to predators like mountain lions and bobcats. Smaller mammals included beavers, river otters, gray foxes, and woodland bison. There were wild turkeys, passenger pigeons, barred owls, and numerous songbirds.

In contrast to the fertile valleys are the nearby serpentine barrens, such as Soldiers Delight Natural Environmental Area. These ecosystems are formed on serpentinite, a greenish metamorphic rock low in essential plant nutrients like calcium and high in heavy metals like magnesium, nickel, and chromium, which are toxic to most plants. These areas included prairie grasses like little bluestem, pitch pine, scrub and post oaks, and eastern redcedar. Grasslands attracted grazing animals like elk and white-tailed deer. The habitat also supported specialized insects, including unique moths and butterflies. Birds of the open country, such as bobwhite quail and field sparrows, would have been common.

=== Prehistoric ===
The dominant Native American group in this part of Maryland was the Iroquoian-speaking Susquehannock tribe. They cultivated large fields of the "three sisters" along rivers and streams. They hunted deer, elk, bear, and turkey for meat and hides. They also foraged for nuts (hickory nuts, walnuts, chestnuts), berries, and edible plants. By the late 17th century, a combination of diseases introduced by Europeans and prolonged warfare with the neighboring Iroquois Confederacy reduced the Susquehannock population. European settlers came into a largely depopulated wilderness with lush natural resources.

=== Colonial era ===
The Cockey family were prominent landowners and influential figures in Baltimore County. Thomas Cockey (1676–1737) settled in the Limestone Valley region in 1725 at Taylor's Hall (an area now just north of Padonia Road and east of I-83).

=== 19th century ===
Cockeyville's founding is usually credited to Joshua Frederick Cockey (1765–1821), who in 1810 opened a hotel and tavern at a central junction on the Baltimore and York-Town Turnpike (York Road), a major toll road chartered in 1787 that served as the primary route for horse-drawn wagons and stagecoaches moving between the port of Baltimore and points north into Pennsylvania. Cockey's hotel became a stopping point for travelers, teamsters, and farmers, and a small commercial center soon grew up around it.

In the 1830s, the Baltimore and Susquehanna Railroad (later the Northern Central Railway) laid tracks through the village, paralleling the York Road. Cockeysville was now a station on a rail line connecting Baltimore to Harrisburg and the national rail network. The dual-transportation hub made the village a commercial hub for northern Baltimore County. The railroad allowed the export of marble from the nearby Texas and Beaver Dam quarries; limestone, and agricultural products like grain, hay, and dairy were sent by freight car. The town grew, a post office was established, churches founded, and new businesses serving the surrounding agricultural and industrial community. Judge Joshua F. Cockey (1800–1891), a lifelong resident who was a businessman before being appointed as judge in the 1830s, built the town train station and accompanying commercial buildings. In 1851, Cockeysville citizens voted against becoming the county seat. The town wanted to retain its rural character, and was concerned about a county jail that could instigate disorderly gatherings. The county seat went instead to Towson, Maryland.

Cockeysville was the scene of some Civil War activity. Confederate soldiers pushed into the Baltimore area, intending to cut off the city and Washington from the north. On July 10, 1864, Confederate cavalry under General Bradley T. Johnson entered Cockeysville, destroying telegraph lines and track along the Northern Central Railway. They also burned the first bridge over the Gunpowder Falls, just beyond nearby Ashland. Abraham Lincoln passed through by train several times, including on his way to give the Gettysburg Address and when his funeral train's return to Illinois. After the war, Joshua F. Cockey III (1837–1920) founded the National Bank of Cockeysville (1891) and other commercial ventures in the community, as well as developing dwellings along the York Turnpike.

=== 20th century ===
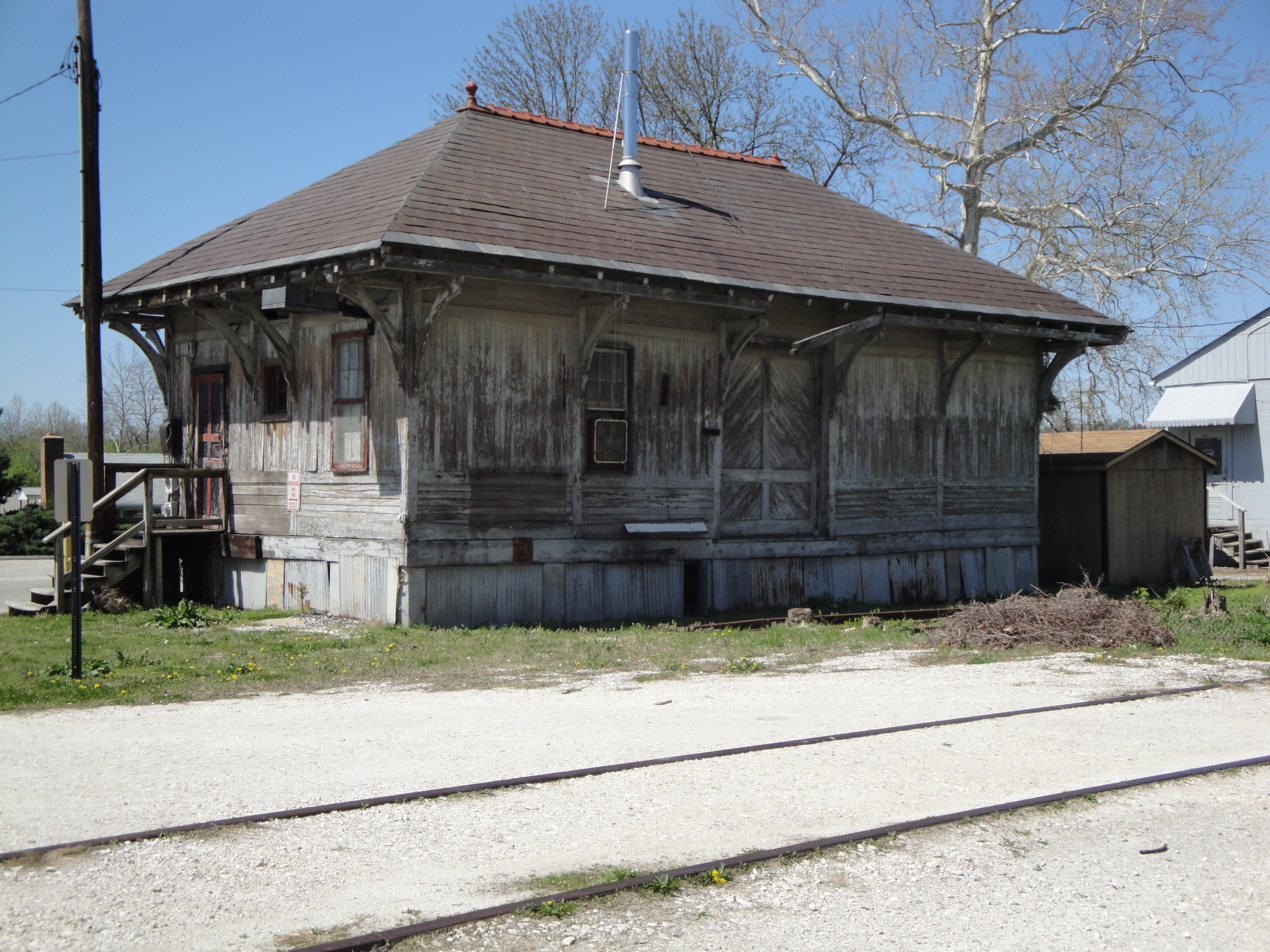
The former Cockeysville freight station in 2011

Following the developments of the 19th century, the arrival of automobiles brought significant changes to Cockeysville. The York Road, previously a path for horses and wagons, was modernized for automobile traffic, becoming part of U.S. Route 111 and later designated Maryland Route 45. While the railroad remained important for freight, the automobile made Cockeysville more accessible, beginning its transformation from a rural village into a suburb. Beginning in the 1950s, these trends increased as the farmland that had surrounded the village was sold and developed into single-family homes and apartments. This residential boom was amplified by the construction of the Baltimore-Harrisburg Expressway (I-83), completed through the area in 1959. The expressway supplanted York Road as the primary artery. As passenger traffic moved to the highways, service on the Northern Central line saw dwindling service. In 1972, Hurricane Agnes caused catastrophic damage to the railway's bridges and infrastructure, permanently severing the rail link to Harrisburg.

In the 1970s and 1980s, York Road changed from a town main street into a commercial corridor lined with strip malls and shopping centers, such as the Cranbrook Shopping Center and Cockeysville Plaza. Just to the north, the former estate of Olympian G.W.C. Whiting was developed into the Hunt Valley Business Community in the 1960s, attracting major corporations like McCormick & Company. This was followed in 1981 by the opening of the Hunt Valley Mall, a large enclosed shopping center that became the dominant retail anchor for the entire region. While technically Hunt Valley, this corporate and commercial growth was closely connected with Cockeysville. By the 1980s, growth leveled off. In 1992, the Baltimore Light RailLink opened, running along the old right-of-way. Passenger rail service returned to Cockeysville for the first time in decades, now in the form of a modern mass transit system connecting the suburbs to Baltimore City. Beginning in Cockeysville, the abandoned rail line was converted into the Northern Central Railroad Trail, a recreational path for cyclists, hikers, and runners that runs north to York, PA.

=== 21st century ===
The 21st century saw new shifts in the local economy. The long-standing Procter & Gamble manufacturing plant, a major employer for decades, closed in 2018, a symbolic end to a period dominated by heavy industry and manufacturing. In its place, the focus turned toward service industries, healthcare, and corporate offices. The commercial corridor along York Road continued to evolve. Faced with competition from the nearby Hunt Valley Towne Centre and the rise of e-commerce, many older strip malls struggled with vacancies. Aging properties were updated or replaced to attract new tenants, including car dealerships, banks, and restaurants, and convenience-oriented retail.

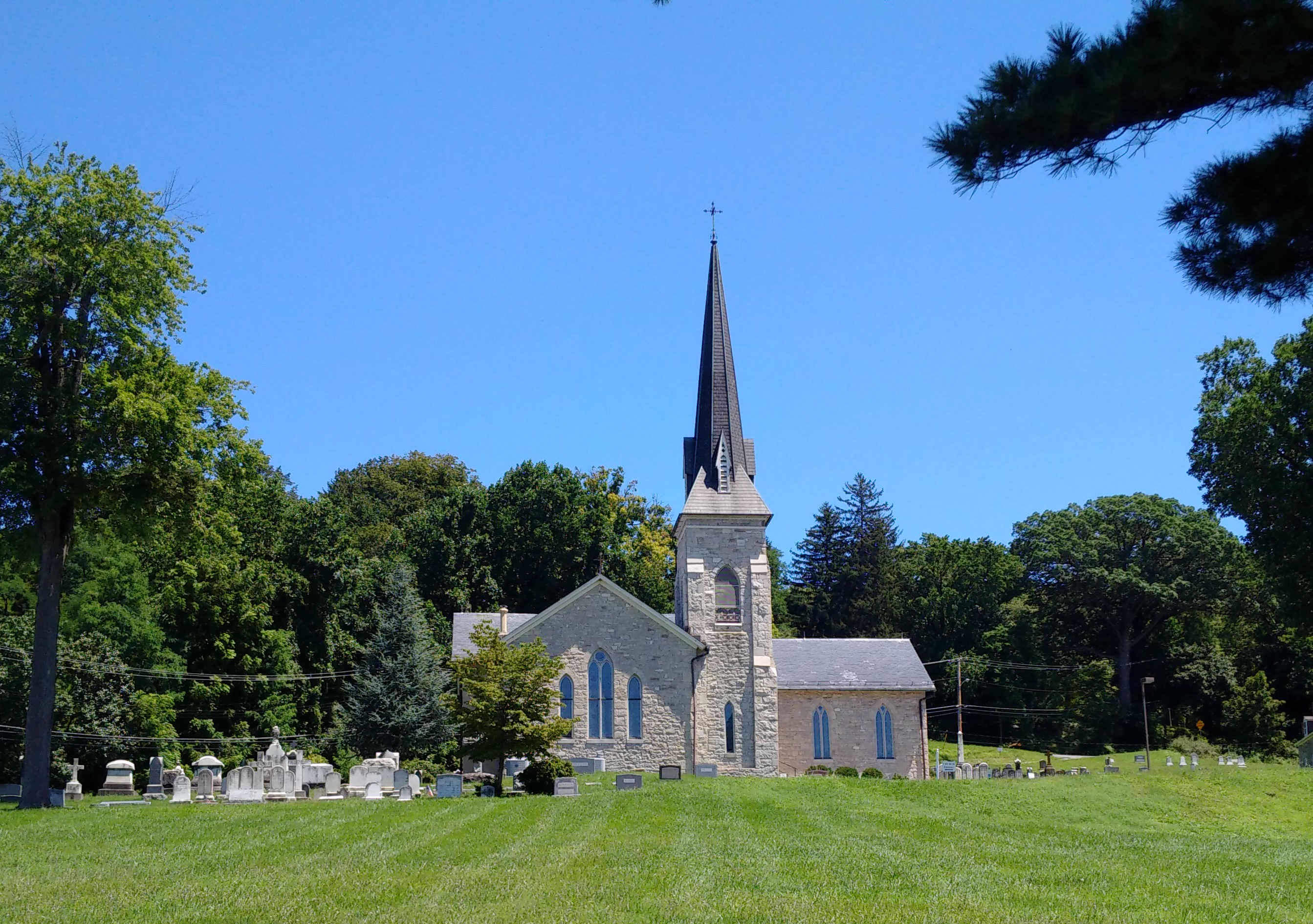
Sherwood Episcopal Church in Cockeysville, founded in 1837

=== Marble industry ===
Cockeysville is underlain by the eponymous Cockeysville Marble, a notably high-quality marble that has played an important role in American history. It can be found in the Washington Monument, the United States Capitol, and buildings throughout Baltimore, including the marble-pile Baltimore City Hall. It is also a primary source for marble in homes and businesses, including the iconic Baltimore rowhouse marble steps. The Beaver Dam quarry (today a swim club) has been called Maryland's "most celebrated building-stone quarry" because of its storied history providing marble to famous buildings and statues.

The Texas Quarry, near the intersection of I-83 and Warren Road, dates back to the 19th century. Marble from this quarry was used in the first phase of construction (1848–54) of the Washington Monument for the first 152-feet. During the third phase of construction (1880–84), a further 390-feet was furnished using a slightly different-colored stone from the adjacent Beaver Dam quarry.

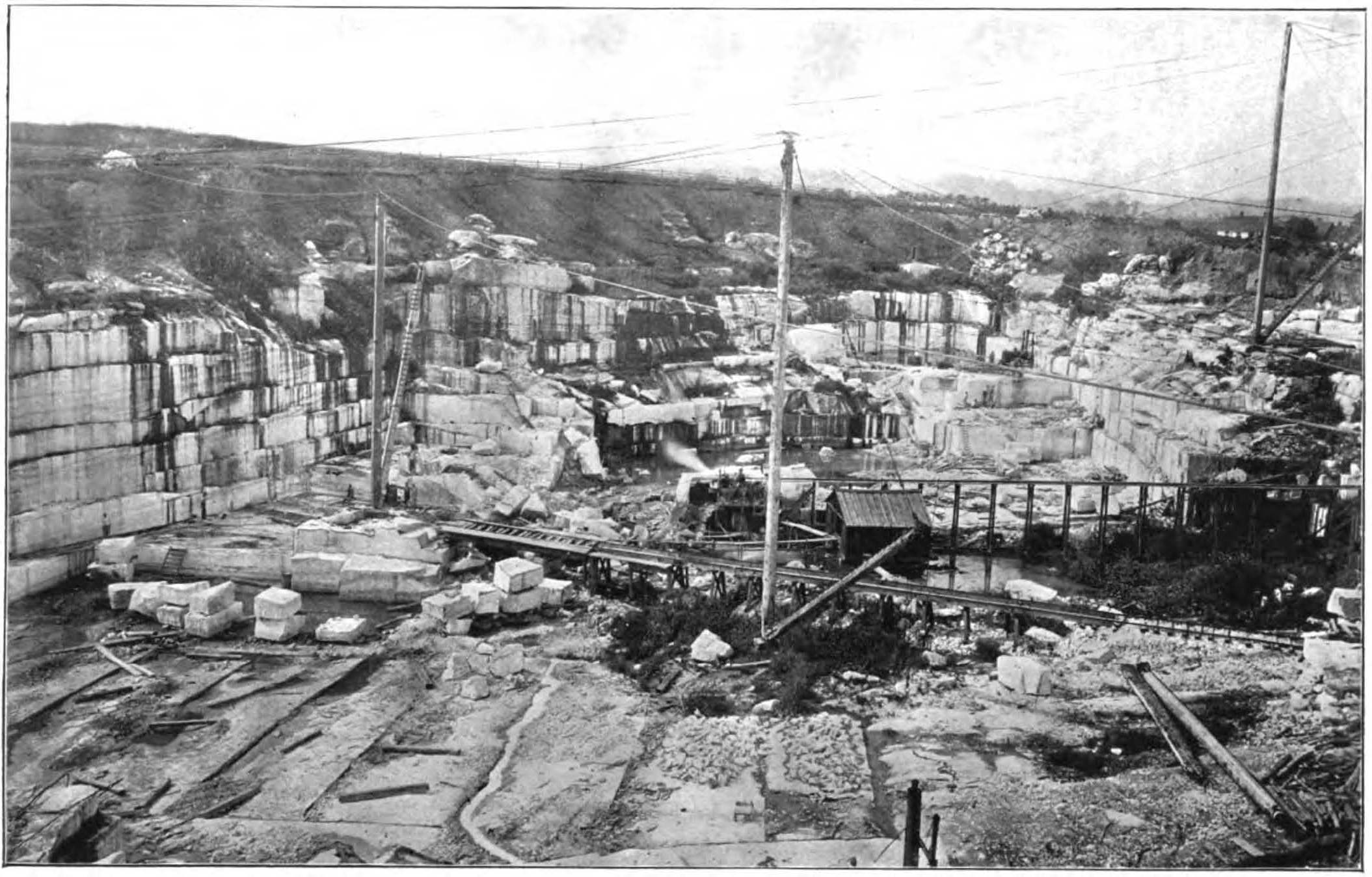
Beaver Dam Quarry in 1898

=== Texas, Maryland ===
Throughout the 19th and early 20th centuries, the village of Texas, Maryland, existed just south of Cockeysville before eventually being absorbed by Cockeysville. The community was founded in the 1840s to support local marble quarries, an industry that became commercially viable after the arrival of the railroad in 1832 enabled the large-scale export of stone. The village became a primary destination for immigrant marble workers, particularly a large group of Irish famine refugees from the village of Ballykilcline in County Roscommon who arrived in the late 1840s and soon made up more than half the population. The "quarry Irish" were crucial to the success of the area's quarries. Early on, the community went by several names; some records refer to it as "Clarksville", named after a quarry operator, but this conflicted with the existing Clarksville, Maryland; at one time it had a post office name of "Ellengowan," taken from Sir Walter Scott's novel Guy Mannering. The issue was settled when a vote was taken and the town was renamed New Texas. Although the origin of "Texas" is uncertain, one local historian suggests it was proposed by returning veterans of the Mexican–American War in light of their experiences.

Texas had a Roman Catholic church, a post office, and a train depot. The 1940 Census listed Texas with a population of 494, comprising 111 dwellings, three farms, eight businesses, one school, two churches, one public building, two industrial plants, one cemetery, and one amusement park. After World War II, as the suburbs expanded, Cockeysville grew over and around the smaller Texas. There is no definitive date when Texas ceased to exist, but the closure of the Texas post office in 1951 was key. Residents began using a Cockeysville mailing address, and the name "Texas" fell out of common use for addressing purposes. Today, the U.S. Census Bureau includes the entire area of historic Texas within the boundaries of the much larger "Cockeysville Census-Designated Place (CDP)." The "Texas" identity is preserved in places like the Texas Quarry, Texas Road, and the Texas station on the Baltimore Light RailLink (the station was never completed and is currently not in use).

=== Historic locations ===
Stone Hall was listed on the National Register of Historic Places in 1973. Baltimore County School No. 7 was added to the National Register in 2000.

== Local institutions ==
Cockeysville is home to the Cockeysville Branch of the Baltimore County Public Library and the Historical Society of Baltimore County.

=== Schools in Cockeysville ===
Public schools:

- Padonia International Elementary
- Warren Elementary School
- Cockeysville Middle School
- Dulaney High School

Private schools:

- St. Joseph School (Pre-K - 8)

=== Grand Lodge ===
The Grand Lodge of Maryland, Ancient, Free, and Accepted Masons, is located in Cockeysville on a 250-acre (1.0 km^{2}) campus. It includes a castle-like structure known as Bonnie Blink ("Beautiful View" in Scots), which is the retirement home for Master Masons, Eastern Star ladies and eligible family members. Located throughout the Grand Lodge are detailed, hand-laid tile storyboards depicting Masonic themes.

Adjacent to the Grand Lodge building is the Freemason's Hall, containing the Maryland Grand Lodge Museum. The museum has the desk that George Washington resigned his commission on, prior to becoming president, a rare Latin Bible from 1482, and some jewels and regalia of Maryland's past Grand Masters.

== Geography ==
Cockeysville is located at 39°28′24″N 76°37′36″W (39.473273, −76.626703), north of the Baltimore Beltway (Interstate 695) along Interstate 83 and York Road. It is bordered on the east by Loch Raven Reservoir, on the south by Timonium, and on the west by rural Baltimore County. Most commercial activity is concentrated along York Road.

According to the United States Census Bureau, the CDP has a total area of 11.5 square miles (29.9 km^{2}), of which 11.4 square miles (29.5 km^{2}) is land and 0.15 square miles (0.4 km^{2}) of it (1.21%) is water.

== Geology ==
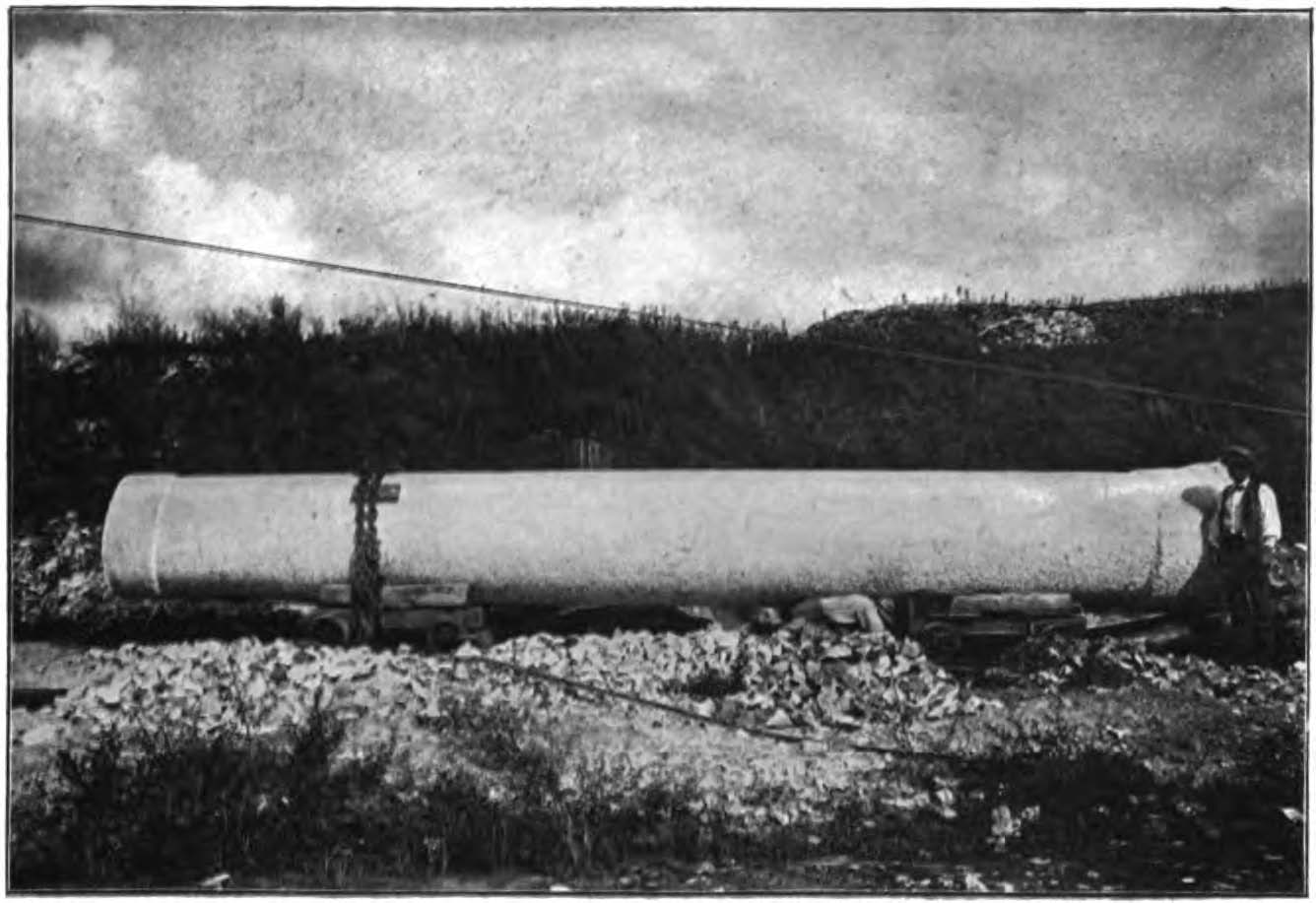
Thirty-Eight Ton Monolith made from Cockeysville Marble

The Precambrian, Cambrian, or Ordovician Cockeysville Marble underlies much of Cockeysville and has been quarried there.

== Transportation ==
=== Roads ===
- Baltimore-Harrisburg Expressway (I-83)
- Beaver Dam Road
- Cranbrook Road
- McCormick Road
- Padonia Road
- Paper Mill Road/Ashland Road (MD-145)
- Shawan Road
- Warren Road (MD-943)
- York Road (MD-45)

=== Public transportation ===
The Maryland Transit Administration's Light RailLink line runs through Cockeysville. The Warren Road stop is the stop in the area.

Bus Route 93 operates along York and some other roads in the area.

== Demographics ==
Historical population
Census	Pop.	Note	%±
1980	17,013		—
1990	18,668		9.7%
2000	19,388		3.9%
2010	20,776		7.2%
2020	24,184		16.4%
U.S. Decennial Census

=== Racial and ethnic composition ===
Cockeysville, Maryland – Racial and ethnic composition Note: the US Census treats Hispanic/Latino as an ethnic category. This table excludes Latinos from the racial categories and assigns them to a separate category. Hispanics/Latinos may be of any race.
Race / Ethnicity (NH = Non-Hispanic)	Pop 2000	Pop 2010	Pop 2020	% 2000	% 2010	% 2020
White alone (NH)	14,730	12,182	12,167	75.97%	58.63%	50.31%
Black or African American alone (NH)	1,682	3,708	4,812	8.68%	17.85%	19.90%
Native American or Alaska Native alone (NH)	38	50	49	0.20%	0.24%	0.20%
Asian alone (NH)	1,914	2,604	2,828	9.87%	12.53%	11.69%
Native Hawaiian or Pacific Islander alone (NH)	4	2	17	0.02%	0.01%	0.07%
Other race alone (NH)	20	56	129	0.10%	0.27%	0.53%
Mixed race or Multiracial (NH)	343	523	892	1.77%	2.52%	3.69%
Hispanic or Latino (any race)	657	1,651	3,290	3.39%	7.95%	13.60%
Total	19,388	20,776	24,184	100.00%	100.00%	100.00%

=== 2020 census ===
As of the 2020 census, Cockeysville had a population of 24,184. The median age was 36.0 years. 21.7% of residents were under the age of 18 and 15.3% of residents were 65 years of age or older. For every 100 females there were 93.9 males, and for every 100 females age 18 and over there were 91.2 males age 18 and over.

98.4% of residents lived in urban areas, while 1.6% lived in rural areas.

There were 10,361 households in Cockeysville, of which 28.5% had children under the age of 18 living in them. Of all households, 36.3% were married-couple households, 23.9% were households with a male householder and no spouse or partner present, and 31.9% were households with a female householder and no spouse or partner present. About 35.4% of all households were made up of individuals and 10.9% had someone living alone who was 65 years of age or older.

There were 11,137 housing units, of which 7.0% were vacant. The homeowner vacancy rate was 1.5% and the rental vacancy rate was 6.5%.

Racial composition as of the 2020 census
Race	Number	Percent
White	12,595	52.1%
Black or African American	4,890	20.2%
American Indian and Alaska Native	129	0.5%
Asian	2,834	11.7%
Native Hawaiian and Other Pacific Islander	20	0.1%
Some other race	1,906	7.9%
Two or more races	1,810	7.5%
Hispanic or Latino (of any race)	3,290	13.6%

=== 2000 census ===
As of the census of 2000, there were 19,388 people, 9,176 households, and 4,450 families residing in the CDP. The population density was 1,718.4 inhabitants per square mile (663.5/km^{2}). There were 9,606 housing units at an average density of 851.4 per square mile (328.7/km^{2}). The racial makeup of the CDP was 77.97% White, 9.89% Asian, 8.87% African American, 0.29% Native American, 0.02% Pacific Islander, 1.02% from other races, and 1.94% from two or more races. Hispanic or Latino of any race were 3.39% of the population.

There were 9,176 households, out of which 22.5% had children under the age of 18 living with them, 35.9% were married couples living together, 9.2% had a female householder with no husband present, and 51.5% were non-families. 38.9% of all households were made up of individuals, and 7.1% had someone living alone who was 65 years of age or older. The average household size was 2.10 and the average family size was 2.87.

In the CDP, the population was spread out, with 18.9% under the age of 18, 13.3% from 18 to 24, 36.5% from 25 to 44, 21.2% from 45 to 64, and 10.1% who were 65 years of age or older. The median age was 33 years. For every 100 females, there were 93.7 males. For every 100 females age 18 and over, there were 93.8 males.

The median income for a household in the CDP was $43,681, and the median income for a family was $62,266 (these figures had risen to $60,088 and $92,392 respectively as of a 2007 estimate). Males had a median income of $40,732 versus $32,177 for females. The per capita income for the CDP was $29,080. About 4.7% of families and 8.2% of the population were below the poverty line, including 7.1% of those under age 18 and 5.5% of those age 65 or over.

== Notable people ==
- Emory Cole (1893–1968), former member of the Maryland House of Delegates from 1955 to 1959
- Dutch Ruppersburger, former U.S. congressman and former Baltimore County executive
- Reid Wiseman, commander of the NASA Artemis II mission

== See also ==
Hunt Valley, Maryland, adjoining Cockeysville
