= Moores Branch =

Stream in Missouri, U.S.

Coordinates: 37.767475°N 94.529607°W

Moores Branch is a stream in Bourbon County, Kansas and Vernon County, Missouri.

Moores Branch was named in honor of an early pioneer.

== See also ==
- List of rivers of Kansas
- List of rivers of Missouri
