= Wissahickon Formation =

Mapped bedrock unit in Pennsylvania, New Jersey, and Delaware

- Stratigraphic range: Ediacaran to Early Cambrian (Depositional)
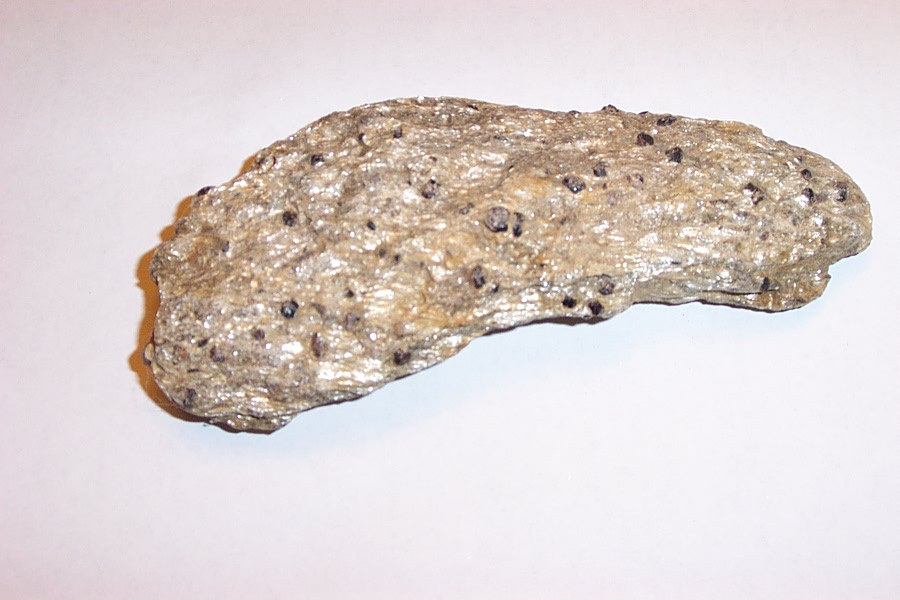
- A hand sample of the type Wissahickon from the banks of the Wissahickon Creek
- Type: Geological formation
- Sub-units: Mt. Cuba, Doe Run schist, Laurels schist, Greystone schist
- Underlies: Hardyston Quartzite
- Overlies: Chestnut Hill Formation
- Thickness: unknown

Lithology
- Primary: Schist
- Other: Gneiss and quartzite

Location
- Region: Piedmont of eastern North America
- Country: United States
- Extent: Southeastern Pennsylvania, northern Delaware, Northeastern Maryland

Type section
- Named for: The Wissahickon Creek

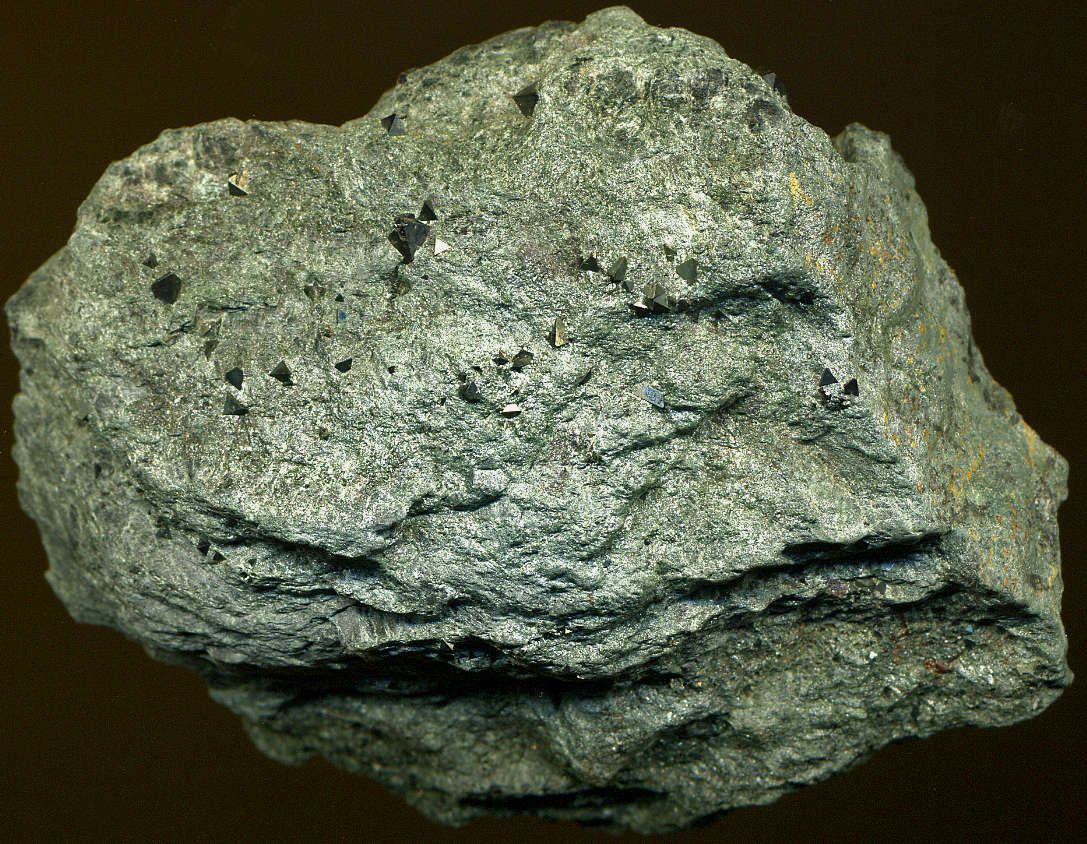
Sample of the Wissahickon from Maryland

The Wissahickon Formation is a mapped bedrock unit in Pennsylvania, New Jersey, and Delaware. It is named for the Wissahickon gorge in Fairmount Park, Philadelphia.

In Maryland formations, the term "Wissahickon" is no longer used. Rocks in this classification have since been divided into several units, such as Lower Pelitic Schist and Prettyboy Schist.

== Description ==
The Wissahickon is described as a pelitic schist and gneiss with interlayers of quartzite. Color is highly variable as is the mineralogy. A general description for the unit is a silver to brown garnet mica-schist.

=== Metamorphic grade ===
The highly variable nature of this rock type is also why the metamorphic grade is also complex. The existence of the minerals biotite, garnet, staurolite, and kyanite all imply a low-intermediate to high metamorphic grade. The metamorphic facies, which is described as lower to upper amphibolite facies, implies a moderate to high metamorphic temperature and a moderate pressure.

== Age ==
=== Depositional age ===
The age indicated on the most recent geologic map of southeast Pennsylvania shows the Wissahickon being Ediacaran to Cambrian in age. This age is a relative date since the sediments that created the Wissahickon are highly deformed and went through several deformation events.

=== Deformation age ===
The sediments of the Wissahickon were altered during the Taconic orogeny and most dates do not place the deformation older than the Silurian. Although there is some evidence of Devonian-aged deformation.

== Divisions ==
The current map sought to divide the Wissahickon into three informal units. The type described here has been the restricted Wissahickon, or its easternmost section that exists in the City of Philadelphia and eastern Delaware County. The Glenarm Wissahickon and Mt. Cuba Wissahickon are two units described in western Delaware and Chester Counties, Pennsylvania. The metamorphic and depositional histories of these two series are different from the Wissahickon type described here.

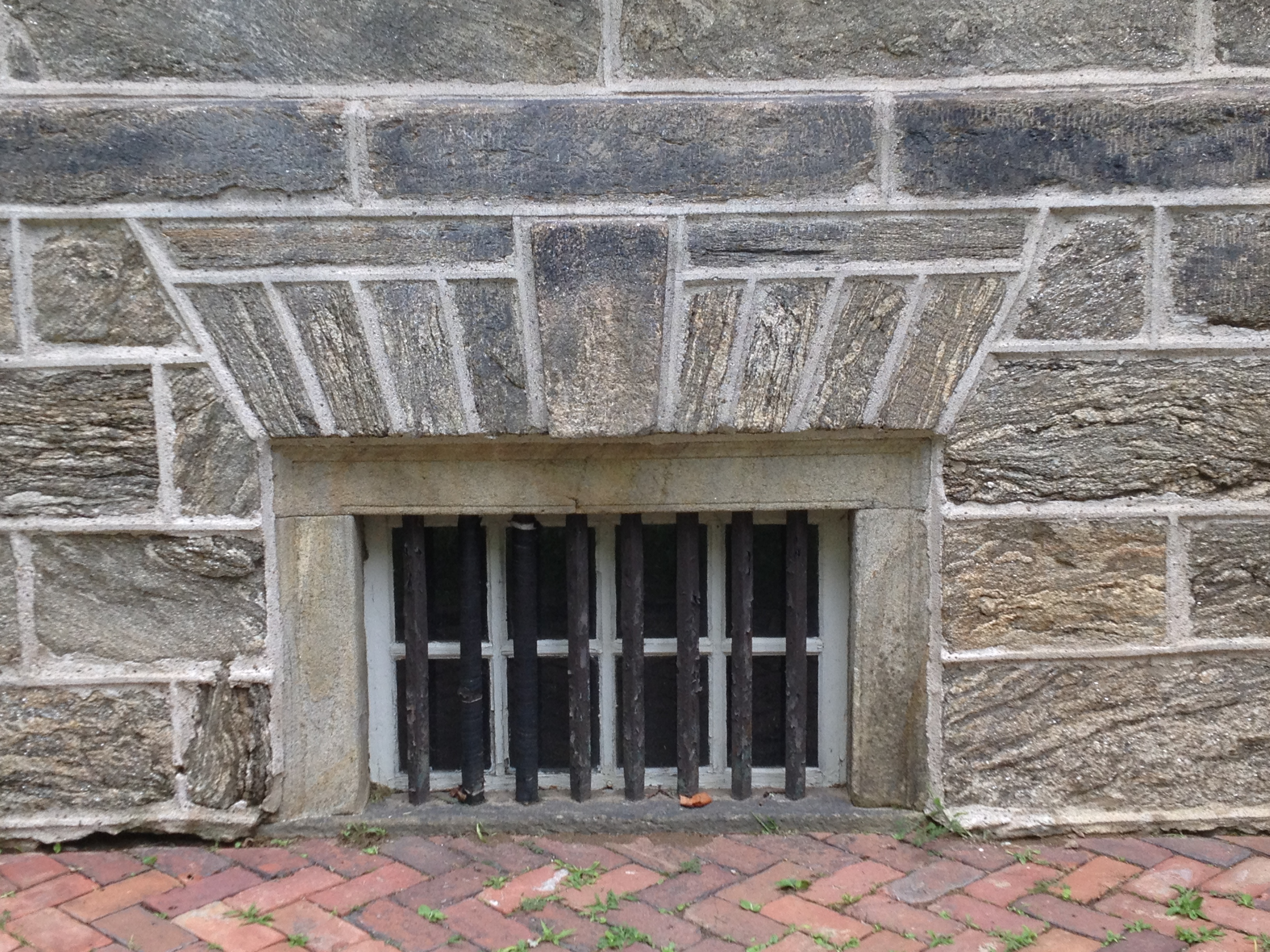
Wissahickon schist, Cliveden, Philadelphia

== Economic uses ==
Wissahickon schist is quarried as a building stone and is used primarily as a decorative stone rather than a weight bearing stone. However, there are numerous old buildings in the Philadelphia area that are constructed almost entirely of this rock.

== See also ==
- Geology of Pennsylvania
- Geology of Delaware
- Wissahickon Creek
