= Cockeysville Marble =

Marble formation in Maryland, US

- Stratigraphic range: Precambrian, Cambrian, or Ordovician
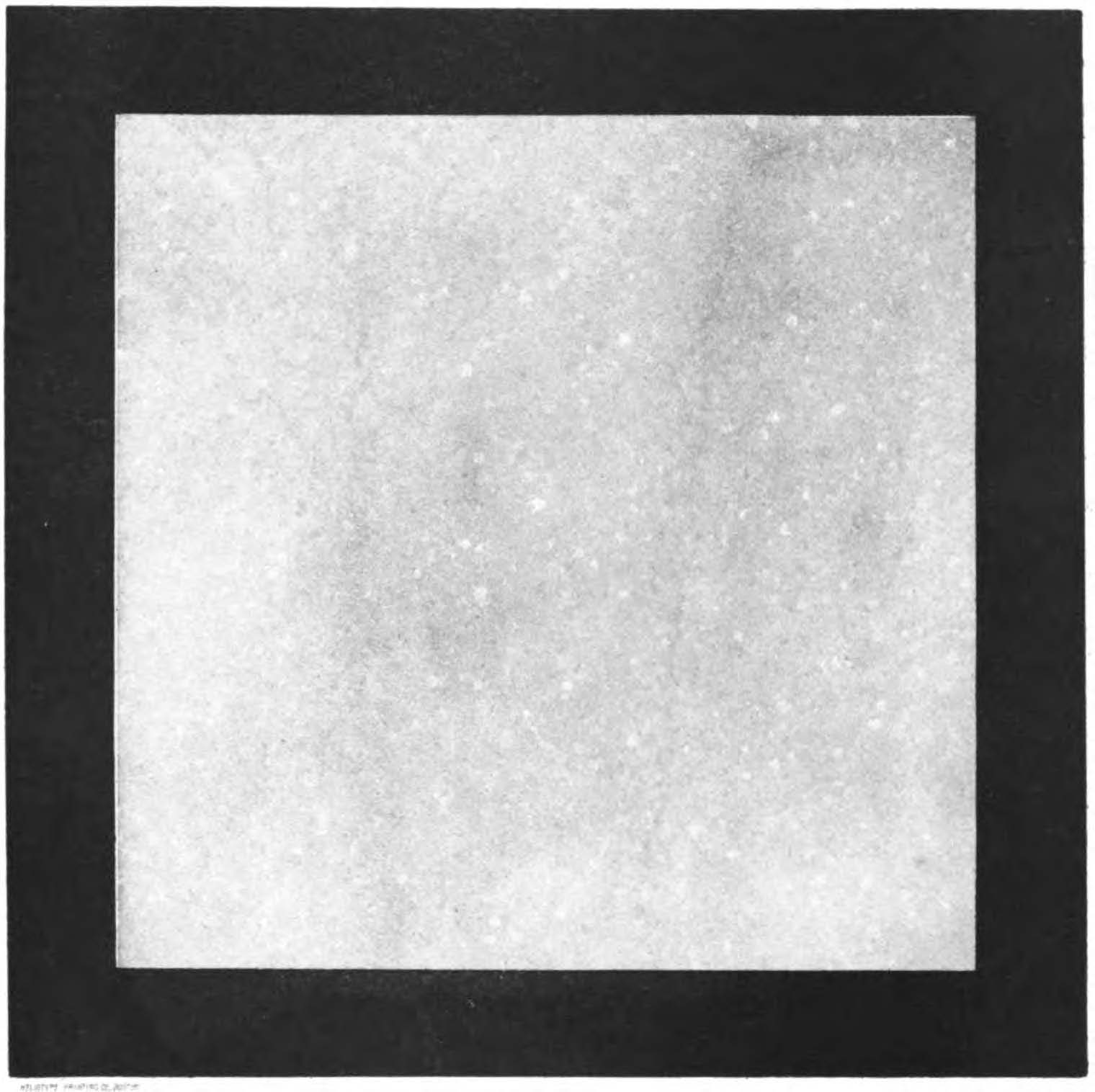
- Polished slab of the marble from Cockeysville. Width of slab inside black border is approximately 10.7 cm.
- Type: metamorphic
- Unit of: Glenarm Supergroup
- Underlies: Wissahickon Formation
- Overlies: Setters Formation
- Thickness: about 750 feet

Lithology
- Primary: marble

Location
- Region: Piedmont of Maryland

Type section
- Named for: Cockeysville, Maryland
- Named by: Williams and Darton, 1892

The Cockeysville Marble is a Precambrian, Cambrian, or Ordovician marble formation in Baltimore, Carroll, Harford and Howard Counties, Maryland. It also occurs in two locations in northern Delaware. It is described as a predominantly metadolomite, calc-schist, and calcite marble, with calc-gneiss and calc-silicate marble being widespread but minor.

The extent of this formation was originally mapped in 1892 within Baltimore County by G. H. William, who also named it Cockeysville Marble.

Due to its historical significance, it was proposed in 2020 to include it as a Global Heritage Stone Resource, a designation that provides international recognition of natural stone resources that have achieved widespread utilization in human culture.

== History ==
=== Limestone origin ===
Millions of years ago, the rock that became the Cockeysville Marble was deposited as a very large, thick bed of limestone at the bottom of an ancient sea. During the formation of the Appalachian Mountains, immense heat and pressure were applied to the entire region. This regional metamorphism cooked the limestone bed, transforming it into the crystalline marble we see today. This belt of Cockeysville Marble was sandwiched between much harder, more resistant rocks (like the Wissahickon Formation, predominantly schist). Over millions of years, weather and water eroded the entire landscape. The soft, calcium-rich marble eroded away much more quickly than the hard schist. The result is that the areas with marble became low-lying, rolling valleys, while the areas with hard schist were left standing as the steep ridges that enclose the valleys. The Cockeysville Marble is a major geological formation, covering many square miles and extending hundreds of feet deep. The marble quarries are places where the overlying soil has been removed to expose and extract this resource.

=== Limestone valleys ===
The region in northern Baltimore County mostly west of I-83 includes five so-called "limestone valleys" that collectively are known as "The Valleys" or historically "Limestone Valley". These five liner valleys are known as Green Spring Valley Historic District, Caves Valley Historic District, Worthington Valley Historic District, Stringtown, and Western Run, each underlain by Cockeysville Marble. "The Valleys" refers to a non-profit community organization that seeks to manage sprawl. "Limestone Valley" is a historical and geological identifier for the region which is underlain with Cockeysville Marble. Thus some parts of the broader Limestone Valley, such as the towns of Cockeysville and Hunt Valley, are not part of The Valleys which is an area defined by policy, not geology. The valleys' collective boundaries are, for the most part, the boundaries of an immense marble formation.

=== Quarrying ===
The Cockeysville Marble has been quarried since the 18th century at Beaver Dam and Texas Quarry within Cockeysville. There are dozens of small abandoned quarries in the area that had various owners. An historical account is given in Maryland Geological Survey Volume Two, with a more recent account in "Cockeysville marble: a heritage stone from Maryland, USA" (Josepth T. Hannibal, 2020).

The Cockeysville was also mined for crushed stone at what is now called Quarry Lake. It was known as the McMahon Quarry in the 1940s.

The Cockeysville was mined by Lafarge and by Martin Marietta Inc. at the Marriottsville Quarry, Marrtiottsville, Maryland.

Cockeysville marble extracted from the Beaver Dam and Texas quarries was used in the construction of the United States Capitol, the Washington Monument in Washington D.C., Baltimore City Hall, the Washington Monument in Baltimore, among many other places.

== Gallery ==
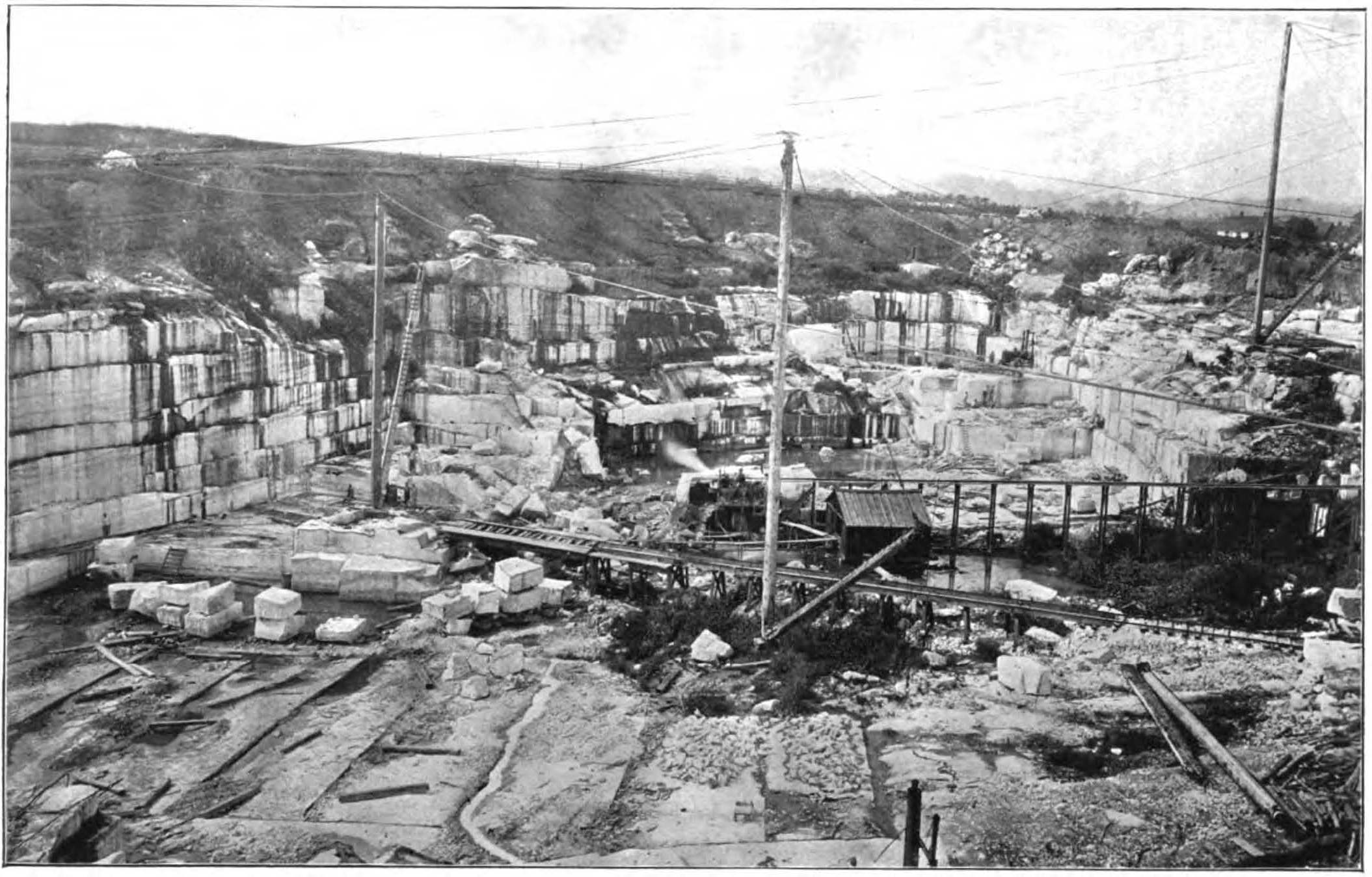
The Beaver Dam Quarry in Cockeysville, c. 1898

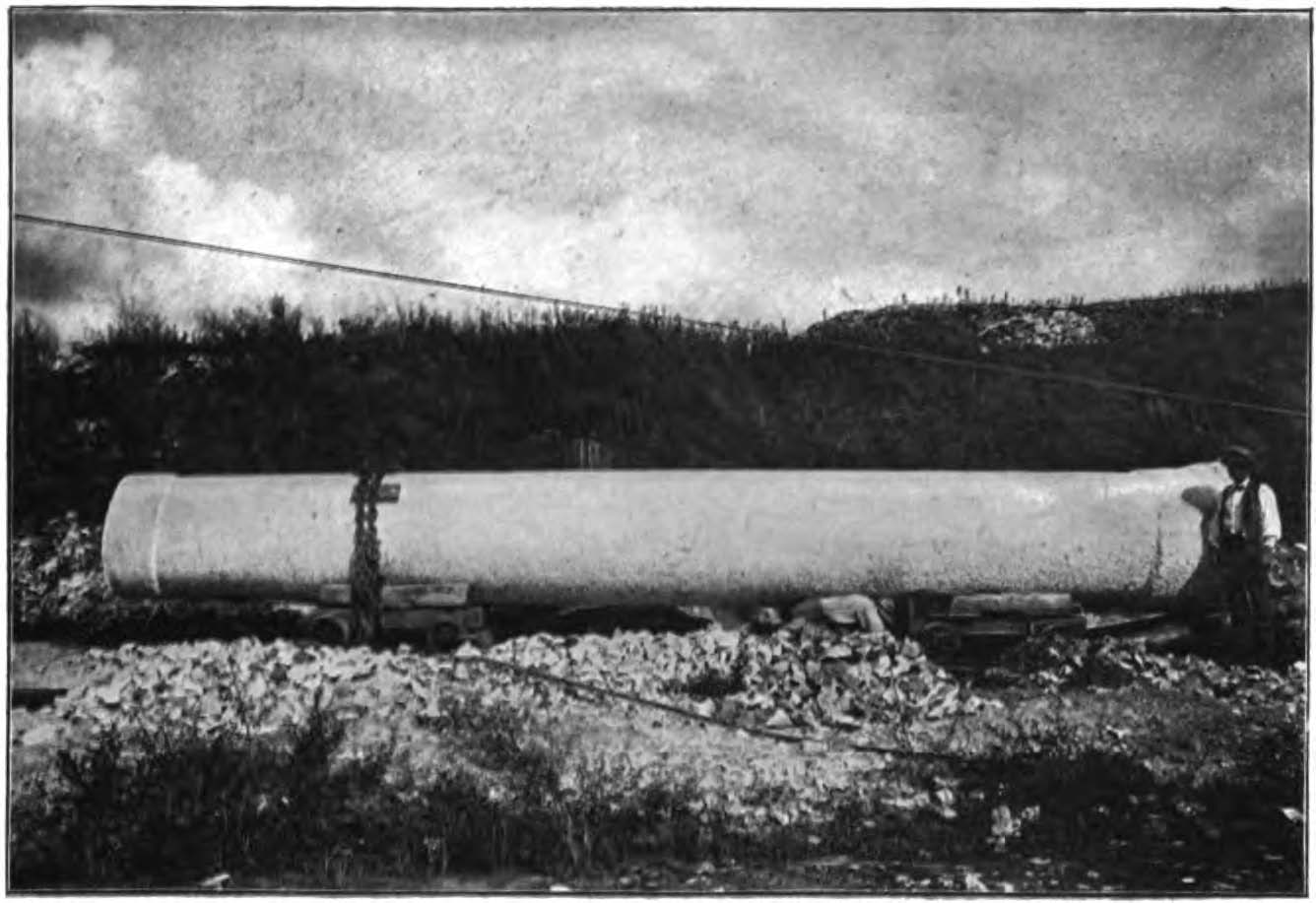
Massive column under construction in 1898. Probably for the Baltimore Courthouse

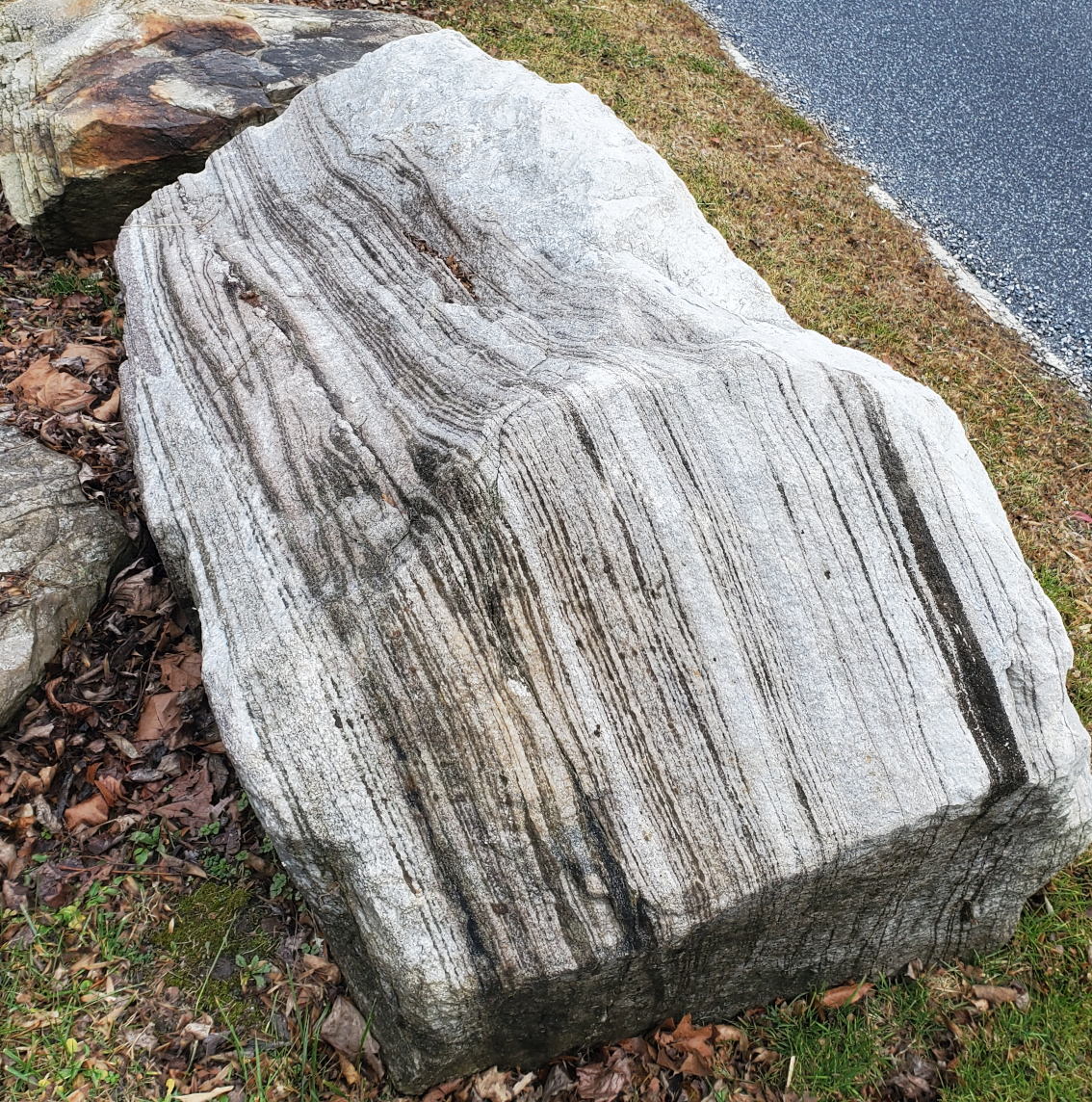
Boulder outside the Marriottsville quarry

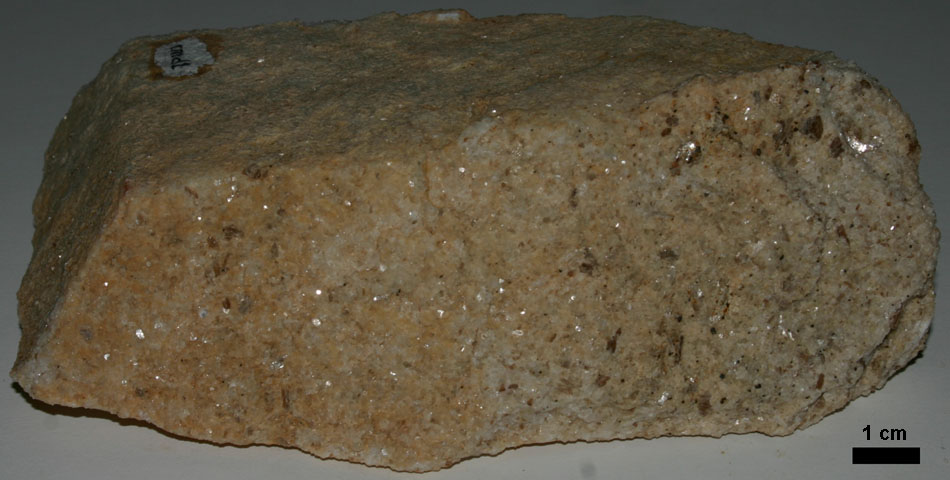
Sample of Massive Metadolostone Member of Cockeysville Marble, from old quarry near Lower Dam of Loch Raven Reservoir, Baltimore County, Maryland

== See also ==
- List of types of marble
