= Culture of Baltimore =

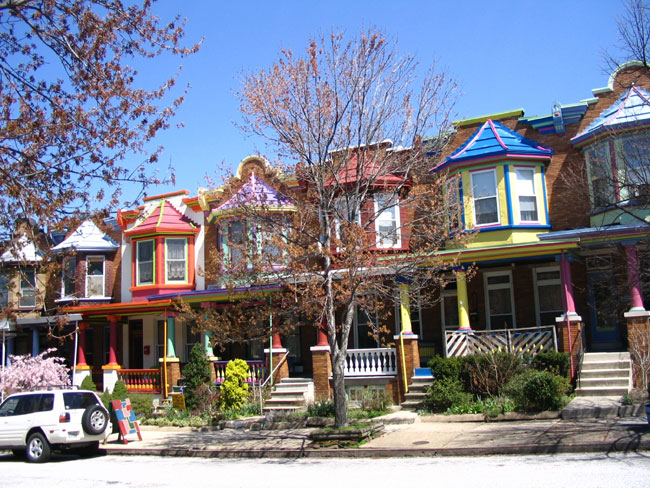
Some of the more upscale rowhouses in Baltimore, like these brightly painted homes in Charles Village, have complete porches instead of stoops

The city of Baltimore, Maryland, has been a predominantly working-class town through much of its history with several surrounding affluent suburbs and, being found in a Mid-Atlantic state but south of the Mason–Dixon line, can lay claim to a blend of Northern and Southern American traditions.

== Food ==
=== Blue crabs ===
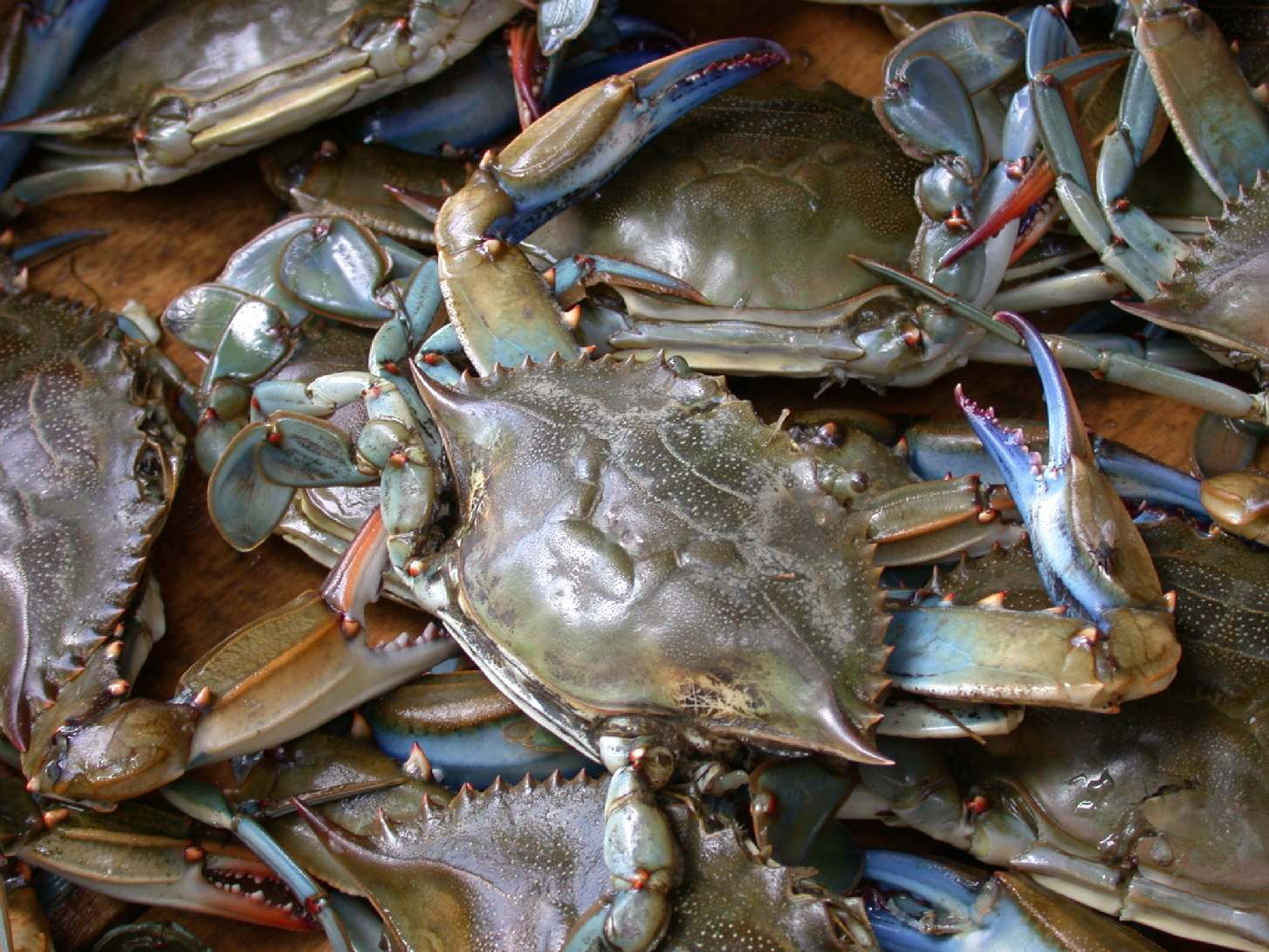
Blue crabs

A prominent example of Baltimore's distinctive flavor is the city's close association with blue crabs. This is a trait which Baltimore shares with the other coastal parts of the state of Maryland. For years the Chesapeake Bay was the East Coast's main source of blue crabs. Baltimore, due to its location, became an important hub of the crab industry. In Baltimore's tourist district (located between Harborplace and Fells Point), numerous restaurants serve steamed hard shell crabs, soft shell crabs, and lump backfin crabcakes. Many district shops even sell crab-related merchandise.

Traditionally, crabs are steamed in rock salt and Old Bay Seasoning, a favored local spice mixture manufactured in Baltimore for decades.

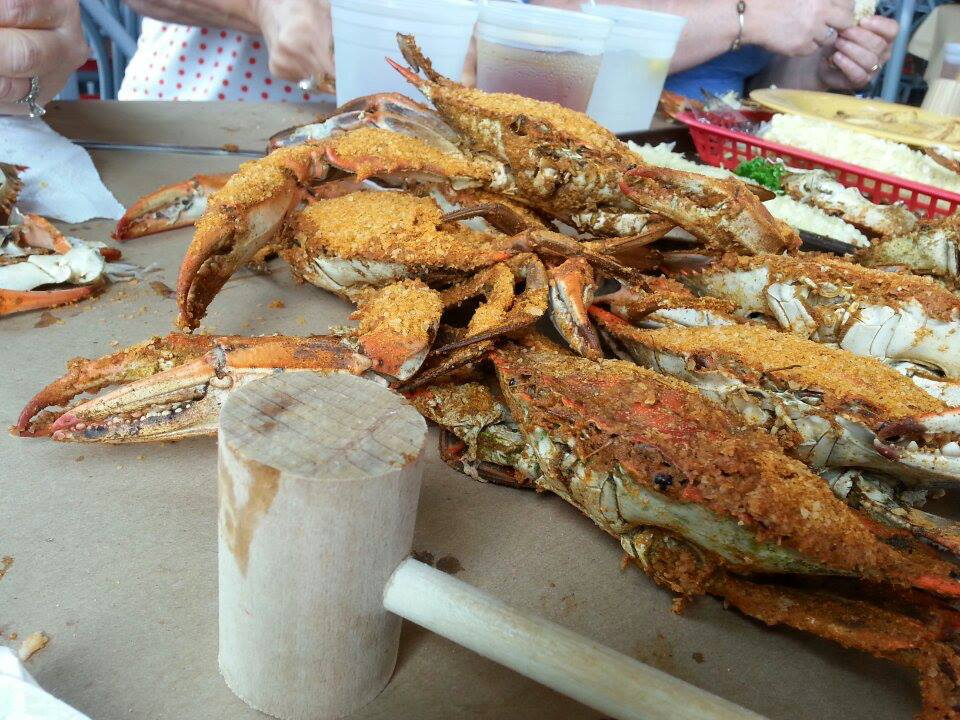
Marylanders steam blue crabs, usually in water, beer, and Old Bay Seasoning.

The crabs are served at tables that have been covered with old newspapers or even brown wrapping papers. The meat from the crabs is taken out using wooden mallets, knives, and bare hands. It is popular for cold beer to be thrown on the crabs during the steaming process, and made available afterward.

=== Crab cakes ===
A traditional Baltimore crab cake generally consists of steamed blue crab lump and/or backfin meat, egg, mayonnaise, Old Bay seafood seasoning, cracker crumbs, and mustard. It is prepared by either broiling or frying. Baltimoreans typically do not use tartar sauce on their crab cakes.

=== Soft crab sandwiches ===
Soft shell crabs are blue crabs that have recently molted their old exoskeleton and are still soft. The entire animal can be eaten, rather than having to shell the animal to reach the meat. The crab is typically tossed in flour seasoned with salt, pepper, and Old Bay Seasoning before being deep-fried or sautéed in butter. It is then placed on toasted bread, typically dressed with mayonnaise, sliced tomato, and lettuce. Some Baltimoreans find amusement in watching visitors to the city stare in horror as they eat soft crab sandwiches with the crab legs sticking out the sides.

=== Sauerkraut ===
It is a common practice to serve sauerkraut with the Thanksgiving turkey. Baltimore was a leading gateway for German immigration during the 19th century. By 1863, the year President Abraham Lincoln declared Thanksgiving a national holiday, one in four of Baltimore's residents were transplanted Germans who spoke German as their first language.

=== Pit beef ===
Pit beef refers to open-pit barbecued meat most commonly served rare on a Kaiser roll, usually found at small stands converted from large sheds in and around Baltimore and the outlying suburbs. It originated on Baltimore's blue-collar east side and has spread throughout the city over the years. Other varieties of meat, such as ham, turkey, corned beef, and sausages are also found on the menus at pit beef stands. Pit beef meat is grilled with charcoal and uses no rubs or sauces, so it lacks the wood flavor characteristic of Texas barbecue and the herbal aromas of Carolina barbecue. Baltimore pit beef is made with top round and shaved very thin on a meat slicer for serving. The typical condiments for a pit beef sandwich are a thick slice of white onion and a sauce made from horseradish and mayonnaise commonly called "Tiger Sauce." Made by Tulkoff Food Products, the Baltimore version is unique in that it uses a much larger portion of horseradish, making the sauce extremely hot.

=== Bull and oyster roasts ===
Bull roasts and oyster roasts are fundraising events held in Baltimore and neighboring counties. Tickets are sold per person or at a discounted rate for the table (seating 8–10 people). They are scheduled during the "R" months (September–April), when oysters are prevalent. The menu may consist of pit beef, ham, turkey, or oysters, the latter being served variously fried, raw (on the half-shell), or stewed with buttery milk or cream. Typically, a smorgasbord of side dishes (such as mashed potatoes, macaroni and cheese, green beans, and coleslaw) is featured, along with a fresh salad bar. Beer and wine may be purchased, while standard drinks (soda, iced tea) are included with the ticket.

In addition to the profits from ticket sales, a variety of gambling and other fundraising activities are often featured, such as a wheel where one bets on numbers (similar to a simplified roulette game), raffles, or auctions. The prizes might be monetary or items donated by residents, organizations, businesses, or sports heroes.

=== Lake trout ===
"Lake trout" is actually fried Atlantic whiting. It is typically served as a sandwich with condiments such as ketchup and horseradish sauce. Lake trout is an everyday food, and is often served wrapped in aluminum foil in a standard paper lunch bag at small take-out establishments.

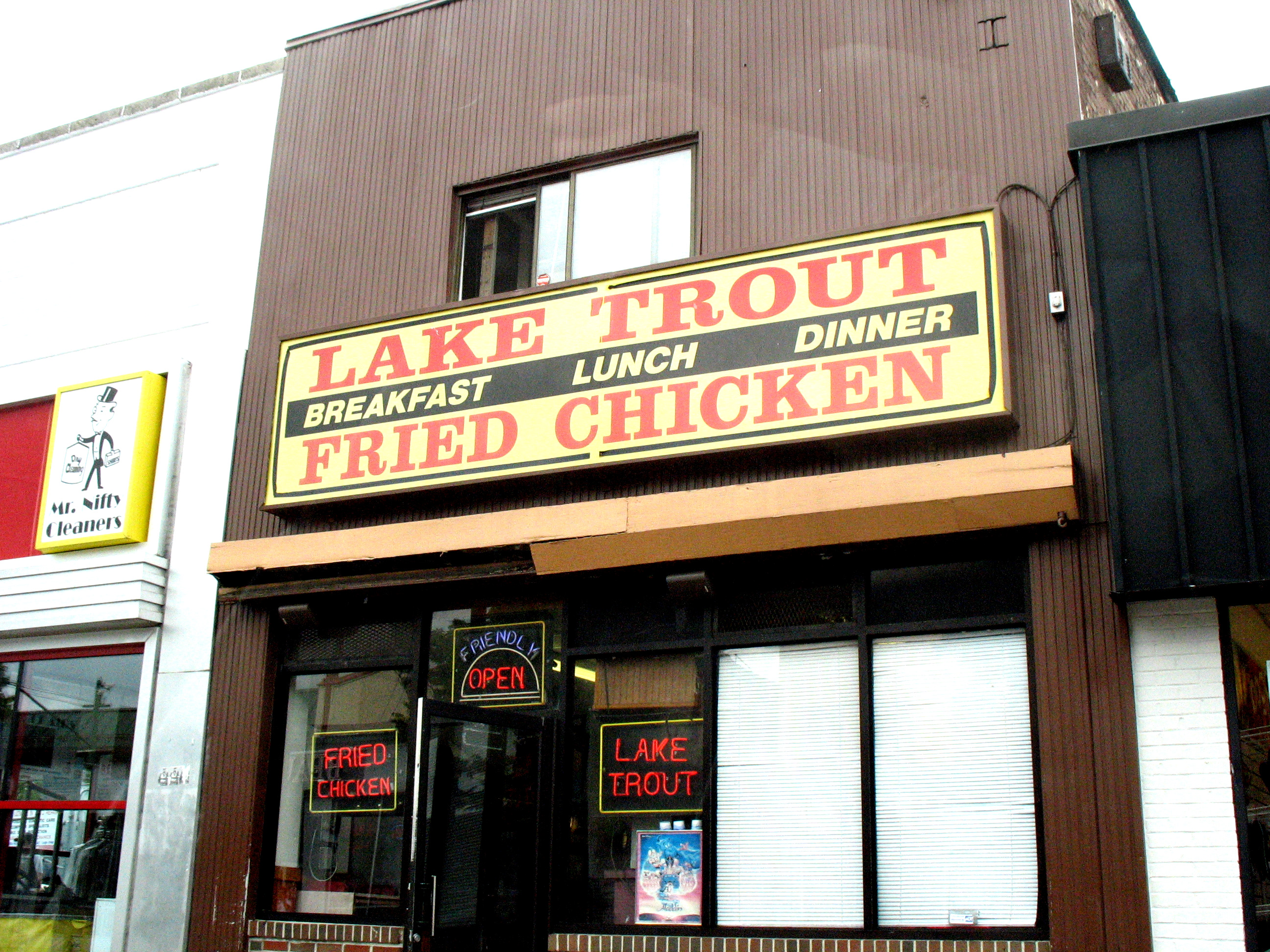
Storefront of establishment selling Lake Trout in Baltimore

=== Chicken box ===
The "chicken box" consists of 4–6 chicken wings, served in a fast food carry out box with some kind of French fries (wedged "western fries", curly fries, or regular fries). Toppings usually consist of salt, pepper, and ketchup, although hot sauce is also popular. The item is chiefly sold at independent fried chicken shops and deli/Chinese take-out in the city. Chicken boxes are usually eaten with "Half and Half", a drink combining iced tea and lemonade (referred to elsewhere in the United States as an "Arnold Palmer").

=== Berger Cookies ===
Berger Cookies are a kind of cookie that enjoys immense popularity in Baltimore and Washington, D.C. They are made from vanilla shortbread covered in a fudge ganache. The recipe was originally brought from Germany to Baltimore by George and Henry Berger in 1835; they are now produced and sold by DeBaufre Bakeries, although there are many imitators of the style.

=== Rheb's Homemade Candies ===
Newlyweds Louis and Esther Rheb moved into their new home at 3352 Wilkens Avenue in 1917 and founded Rheb's Candies. The following year, Louis, self-taught, started making taffies, brittles, fudge, and jellies in his basement. The candies were sold in the markets twice a week, Esther going to Hollins and Louis to Bel Air. In the mid-1930s, they opened in Lexington Market. Louis continued to develop more recipes, and Esther learned to hand-dip the centers in a smooth, velvety chocolate they had blended to complement each piece of candy. Many people came to Wilkens Avenue to buy candy, so they converted their garage into a store. The grand opening took place in 1950. Nowadays, it is Rheb's main store. On Valentine's Day, there is typically a long line of customers outside Rheb's on Wilkens Avenue.

=== Goetze's Candies ===
Goetz's Candy Company was founded in Baltimore, and its factory remains there today. Their caramel creams are soft, chewy caramel with a cream center similar to cake icing, and are found in most corner stores and convenience markets in Baltimore.

=== Lemon peppermint sticks ===
Lemon peppermint sticks are a treat sold at the mid-spring Flower Mart held by the Women's Civic League. These simple "drinks" are made by cutting the top off a small lemon, cutting a hole into the flesh, and shoving a peppermint stick into it. Sucking on the stick and squeezing the lemon produces a sweet, minty, lemony drink. While these treats are mostly sold at Flower Mart, throughout the summer, Baltimoreans will also make them at home or at social gatherings.

=== Natty Boh ===
The city's locally favored beer has traditionally been National Bohemian, commonly referred to as "Natty Boh" or "National" by locals, or jokingly "Nasty Boh". Its reputation as a mass-produced factory beer that is cheap to buy, and the German name "Bohemia", fit with Baltimore's working-class culture and German heritage.

Natty Boh was the long-time beer of choice for Orioles and Colts fans at Memorial Stadium. After the Colts moved to Indianapolis in 1984 and the Orioles left Memorial Stadium in 1991, Natty Boh was no longer available to fans at sporting events in Baltimore. In 2000, beer brewing in Baltimore was discontinued. However, since the 2006 Orioles season, "Boh is Back" and served at Oriole Park at Camden Yards. National Bohemian beer is currently brewed out of state by the Miller Brewing Company and is distributed to Baltimore by the Pabst Brewing Company.

== Geography ==
Baltimore is divided into several vastly different neighborhoods and regions, all of which hold their own reputation in terms of their crime rates and average income, among other stereotypes. Canton, Baltimore is well known for its young, professional population, alongside its several nightclubs and comedy clubs. The Inner Harbor is home to Baltimore's tourist center. Here, Baltimore's history and culture are exploited, featuring restaurants offering blue crabs and historical highlights such as the USS Constellation. M&T Bank Stadium and Oriole Park at Camden Yards, home to the Baltimore Ravens and the Baltimore Orioles. respectively, are also in the Inner Harbor's vicinity.

== Architecture ==
=== Row houses ===
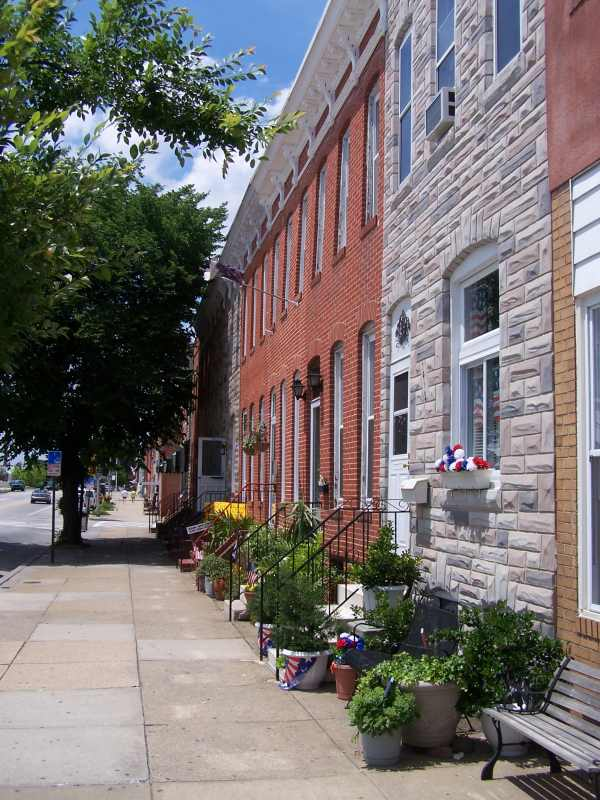
Row houses like these in Locust Point historically comprised much of Baltimore's housing.

Baltimore is noted for its near-omnipresent row houses. Row houses have been a feature of Baltimore architecture since the 1790s, with early examples of the style still standing in the Federal Hill, Locust Point, and Fells Point neighborhoods. Older houses may retain some of their original features, such as marble doorsteps, widely considered to be Baltimore icons in themselves. Later row houses dating from the 1800s–1900s can be found in Union Square and throughout the city in various states of repair. They are a popular renovation property in neighborhoods that are undergoing urban renewal, although the practice is viewed warily by some as a harbinger of "yuppification", particularly when the term "townhouse" is used instead of "row house." Around the city, row houses can be found abandoned and boarded up, reflecting Baltimore's urban blight.

=== Formstone ===
A tour through many of Baltimore's row house neighborhoods will reveal a façade style not found in many other cities: Formstone. Introduced in the 1950s, Formstone was a modern-day solution to early Baltimore brick that was so poor it needed frequent painting to keep it from deteriorating. But soon Formstone became an icon of status for many homeowners.

The appeal of Formstone was that, once installed, it required virtually no maintenance. Salesmen boasted that the installation lasted forever and that the first cost was also the last as no upkeep or repair was required. Salesmen also pointed out that Formstone was also about one-third the cost of other façade improvement solutions. Its colorful stucco veneer gave a stone-like appearance that could be shaped into different textures. Formstone was particularly popular in East Baltimore, where residents believed that the stone imitation made their neighborhood resemble that of an Eastern European town, which some thought had an appearance of affluence.

Patented in 1937 by L. Albert Knight, Formstone was similar to a product that was invented eight years earlier in Columbus, Ohio, and called Permanent Stone. Permanent Stone was also a veneer. In the 1970s preservationists and rehabbers felt that Formstone took away from the historic and architectural value of the homes and many had it removed. This can be a costly and time-consuming process. Once removed, the brick requires a thorough acid-wash cleaning and then repointing of the grout.

=== Marble steps ===
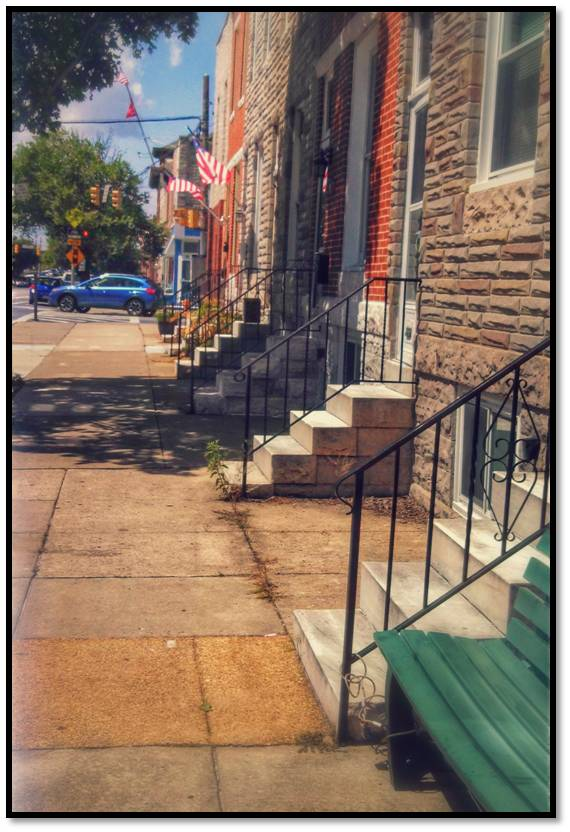
Marble steps in need of a scrubbing with Bon Ami powder and a pumice stone. East Fort Avenue, Locust Point, August 2014

The ubiquity of the marble steps on Baltimore's rowhouses is due to the local availability of Cockeysville Marble, a white stone considered comparable in quality to Italian Carrara marble. It was quarried in significant amounts during the 19th and early 20th centuries from the Beaver Dam quarry, which has been called Maryland's "most celebrated building-stone quarry."

The quarry's prominence grew during the construction of the Washington Monument in the mid-19th century. Its marble was used for the monument's upper 390 feet, and for the 108 columns of the United States Capitol building. This high-profile use made the stone fashionable for decorative purposes in Baltimore, leading to its widespread adoption for the steps of rowhouses, especially in neighborhoods like Fells Point and around the Inner Harbor. This, in turn, led to a cherished community tradition: the Saturday morning scrubbing of the marble steps with Bon Ami powder and a pumice stone to make them gleam white.

== Slang ==
Baltimoreans have a distinct way of pronouncing words in the English language. Typically, many syllables are simply dropped (e.g., Annapolis becomes Napliss). The accent varies; the accent is not as noticeable when spoken by North & West Baltimoreans but is at its heaviest when spoken by East & South Baltimoreans.

=== Hon ===
Although nowadays the city is culturally diverse, the lasting image of Baltimoreans is the "Hon" culture exemplified most markedly by the longer established families and residents of the Highlandtown, Irvington, Canton, Locust Point, Hampden and Pigtown neighborhoods. Between the 1950s and 1970s, it was common to see local working class women dressing in bright, printed dresses with glasses and beehive hairdos. Men were often dressed casually, but with a general factory or dock worker look, as many in town did indeed have such jobs.

The name of the culture comes from the often parodied Baltimore accent and slang. "Hon" (/ˈhʌn/, an abbreviation of "Honey") was a common informal name for someone else. It is almost always used at the end of the sentence, e.g., "how bout dem O's, Hon?" Linguists classify the white Baltimore accent within Delaware Valley American English, which also encompasses Philadelphia. For instance, "Baltimore" is pronounced "Baldamore" or even "Balmer", and "Maryland" becomes "Murland", "Murlan", or "Merlin." Other common pronunciations include "ool", "amblance", "wooder", "warsh", "sharr or shaow", "far", "cowny", "tew", "lor" and "zinc" (oil, ambulance, water, wash, shower, fire, county, two, "lil", and sink respectively). There is also a popular summertime phrase, "goin' downy ayshin" (going down to the ocean, usually referring to Ocean City, Maryland) as well as popular phrases such as, "my (appliance) went up" (meaning died, shortened from "went up to heaven") and "dem O's" (i.e. "them O's", referring to the city's Major League Baseball team, the Baltimore Orioles).

Baltimore native and filmmaker John Waters has parodied the Hon culture, as well as Baltimore itself, extensively in his movies. For a somewhat accurate representation of Baltimorese, one can look to Waters' narration in his 1972 movie Pink Flamingos. Waters himself used a local commercial for Mr Ray's Hair Weaves as his main inspiration. The commercial was famous around town for Mr. Ray's thick East Baltimore accent: "Cawl todaey, for your free hayome showink..." ("Call today, for your free home showing") was the most memorable line from that commercial.

The term has been established in the culture as it has been used for naming businesses including Cafe Hon, and for the annual HonFest.

==== "Hon" as a trademark ====
In November 2010, the term "Hon" was trademarked in Baltimore by local businesswoman Denise Whiting, for use on napkins, buttons, hats and other promotional material for her restaurant, Cafe Hon. The trademark, as stated by Whiting, doesn't prevent anyone from saying "Hon", or using it in general conversation. However, the trademark issue proved to be controversial, and was criticized by Dan Rodricks, columnist for The Baltimore Sun: "You can't own something that doesn't belong to you.... 'Hon' isn't unique to Denise Whiting, no matter how special she wants us to believe she is." The dispute prompted street protests on December 19, 2010, by Baltimore residents.

On November 7, 2011, Whiting held a press conference that also featured Chef Gordon Ramsay announcing that she would be relinquishing the "Hon" trademark; Ramsay stated that with Cafe Hon, "There was a level of hatred that was almost untouchable. I've never known a restaurant to have such a huge issue." The restaurant, and the press conference that was part of Ramsay's visit, was featured on the February 24, 2012, episode of Ramsay's series, Kitchen Nightmares.

Whiting stated that the controversy over trademarking the word "Hon" took a huge toll on her business and her own health. She estimated that since it was first revealed in December 2010 that "Hon" was trademarked to her, the restaurant suffered a "20 to 25 percent drop off" in sales and that she needed to sell her IRAs just to meet payroll.

== Musical and literary culture ==
Baltimore's most enduring music legacy is considered to be in the realm of "old school" jazz where a number of natives gained notoriety after moving to New York City. Chick Webb, Eubie Blake, and Billie Holiday, and classical minimalist composer Philip Glass were all originally from Baltimore.

Others that would find fame in the music business from the area would include jazz-rock composer Frank Zappa, singer Ric Ocasek of The Cars, pop vocalist Mama Cass, and Talking Heads frontman David Byrne.

Baltimore Club is a locally developed style of breakbeat.

In the 2000s, several local alternative/indie bands have risen to national prominence, including Beach House, Animal Collective, Future Islands, Wye Oak, Dan Deacon; however, most of these bands are not native to Baltimore, and moved there in the mid-2000s from other areas of the country such as North Carolina, Purchase, NY, and Long Island. Wye Oak left Baltimore in the mid-2010s.

From the 1860s to the 1880s a number of periodicals were published in Baltimore, including Southern Magazine, South Atlantic, Southern Society, and Continental Magazine.

== Depiction in television and film ==
Baltimore city is known for filming movies and television shows. Many movies have been filmed in Baltimore, one notable one being ...And Justice for All (film) which shows a young attorney getting used to a corrupt legal system. Additionally, television shows such as NBC's Homicide: Life on the Street and HBO's The Wire and The Corner have also been set and filmed in the city.

Barry Levinson, a Baltimore native and filmmaker, made many Baltimore-based films, including: Diner, Avalon, Tin Men, and Liberty Heights. Baltimoreans are extremely fond of Levinson's movies as his actors either use a thick East Baltimore accent or the lighter West Baltimore accent.

Another Baltimore native and filmmaker, John Waters, makes subversive films that glamorize the less socially acceptable side of the city's culture. Many scenes from the 1972 cult classic film Pink Flamingos were shot in the city's Waverly and Hampden neighborhoods. Pink Flamingos was the most popular of Waters' cult films. In 1981, Waters released the more mainstream Polyester with "Odorama" and went on to make Cecil B. Demented, Cry-baby, Pecker, and Serial Mom.

To date, Hairspray, Waters' tribute to The Buddy Deane Show-era Baltimore, has been his most successful commercial effort. He released Hairspray as a film in 1988. In 2002, Hairspray was produced as a stage musical. In 2007, a new version of Hairspray was released as a film. Soundtracks for both films and the musical have also proven popular. Waters is currently in the works of making a sequel to Hairspray.

In addition to works filmed in Baltimore, the city is also home to the Maryland Film Festival, an annual film and video festival of international scope that takes place each May, using the historic Charles Theatre as its anchor venue.

In Season 4, Episode 7 of The Tracey Ullman Show, Baltimore native actor Michael Tucker portrayed the father of Ullman's JoJo character. The skit was set in a Baltimore row house. Tucker advised Ullman to "take a Liverpool accent and Americanize it."

When Welcome Back, Kotter first aired in 1975, some Baltimoreans were shocked to hear the word "sweathog" which, at that time, meant "whore" in many Baltimore neighborhoods. Nowadays, "sweathog" is used to describe an overweight, smelly woman.

== Sports ==
Jousting is the official state sport and lacrosse is the official "team sport" of the State of Maryland and is very popular in Baltimore. City colleges with Division 1 men's and women's teams include Johns Hopkins, Loyola, UMBC, and Towson. The National Lacrosse Hall of Fame and Museum is located in Sparks, MD, north of the city. The city is also home to high-school national championship legacy teams from Boys' Latin, and Gilman on the boy's side, to Bryn Mawr and RPCS on the girls side. The Morgan "Bears" competed during the 1970s and 1980s; the school now has a lacrosse club. M&T Bank Stadium, the home of the Baltimore Ravens, hosts the annual lacrosse double-header events, the Face-Off Classic and Day of Rivals, which have featured several Maryland-based teams. The stadium was the site of the NCAA Men's Lacrosse Final Four in 2003, 2004, 2007, 2010 and 2011.

=== Lore and traditions ===
Prior to Baltimore Ravens home games, a tradition involves touching the show of the status of Johnny Unitas, who played quarterback for the Colts in the mid-twentieth century. The ritual is regarded by some fans as a gesture of good luck.

When the national anthem is played at an Orioles or Ravens game, the word "oh" is emphasized in the line "oh say does that star spangled banner yet wave" by the crowd to show allegiance to the Orioles, using their nickname, the O's. Some national onlookers regard this custom as disrespectful to the nation's anthem.

Nicknames are widely used in Baltimore to refer to certain sports figures or moments. Several Orioles players of the modern era have earned themselves nicknames which have quickly become traditional, such as Chris Davis receiving the nickname "Crush Davis" following his record-setting 2013 season and Nelson Cruz, whose last name is chanted in an elongated fashion whenever he makes a big play at home. The 2012 postseason game between the Ravens and the Broncos has picked up several nicknames, such as the "Mile High Miracle", the "F-bomb", and the "Rocky Mountain Rainbow", each referring particularly to Joe Flacco's pass to Jacoby Jones for a Baltimore touchdown which led to a victory, eventually leading the Ravens to win Super Bowl XLVII.

When the Orioles are thrown into situations where they succeed spectacularly, especially when overcoming an adversarial situation, it is known by the Baltimore community as "Orioles Magic". This term was popularized by the local station WFBR when announcers reacted to Doug DeCinces' walk-off home run over the Detroit Tigers in 1979 by shouting "it might get out of here", followed by an eruption of fan cheering at Memorial Stadium.

Eating Esskay hot dogs and drinking National Bohemian beer at Baltimore sporting events, particularly at Orioles games, has become a long-lasting tradition. National Bohemian is commonly referred to as "Natty Boh" by venues and Baltimoreans.

The term "Birdland" is commonly used to refer to the Baltimore area's fanbase for both the Ravens and the Orioles. MASN, the Orioles' broadcasting network, is commonly accredited with popularizing this term thanks to their promos.

The song Seven Nation Army was popularized in Baltimore as the Ravens' official pump-up song. Seven Nation Army was first played at the Ravens opening game of 2011 against the Steelers, and has been played at every home game since. It can often be heard at Orioles games as well, with fans often singing the signature first two bars of the song as "Oh Oh Oh Oh Oh Oh", referring to the O's (Orioles).

== Tourist attractions ==
- American Dime Museum (closed February 2007)
- American Visionary Art Museum
- Babe Ruth Birthplace and Museum
- Baltimore Ghost Tours
- Baltimore Maritime Museum
- Baltimore Museum of Art
- Baltimore Museum of Industry
- Baltimore Public Works Museum (closed February 2010)
- Baltimore Streetcar Museum
- Basilica of the National Shrine of the Assumption of the Blessed Virgin Mary
- B&O Railroad Museum
- Brown Memorial Presbyterian Church
- Charles Theatre
- Contemporary Museum (suspended operations in 2012)
- Cylburn Arboretum
- Druid Hill Park
- Edgar Allan Poe House and Museum
- Edgar Allan Poe's grave
- Enoch Pratt Free Library
- Evergreen House museum and library
- Fells Point Historic Neighborhood
- Fort McHenry National Monument
- George Peabody Library
- Great Blacks In Wax Museum
- Harborplace
- Hippodrome Theatre
- Historic Ships in Baltimore
- Homewood Museum
- Howard Peters Rawlings Conservatory and Botanic Gardens of Baltimore
- The Jewish Museum of Maryland
- Lacrosse Museum and National Hall of Fame
- Lexington Market
- Lyric Opera House
- Maryland Film Festival
- Maryland Center for History and Culture
- Maryland Science Center
- Maryland Zoo in Baltimore
- Meyerhoff Symphony Hall
- National Aquarium in Baltimore
- National Historic Seaport Scenic Byway
- National Museum of Dentistry
- Patterson Park
- Pimlico Race Course
- Port Discovery
- Pride of Baltimore II Clipper Ship
- Reginald F. Lewis Museum of Maryland African American History & Culture
- The Senator Theatre
- Star Spangled Banner Flag House and 1812 Museum
- Baltimore World Trade Center observation deck
- Walters Art Museum
- Westminster Hall and Burying Ground

== Nouns ==
=== People ===
- Dwight Schultz
- Alan Ameche
- Arabbers
- Baltimore Colts' Marching Band
- Celebration
- George William Brown
- Winston "Buddy" Deane
- Ta-Nehisi Coates
- Art Donovan
- Babe Ruth
- Wye Oak
- Johnny Eck
- Charley Eckman
- Robert Ehrlich
- Aharon Feldman
- Emanuel Feldman
- Felicia "Snoop" Pearson
- Duff Goldman
- Wild Bill Hagy
- Billie Holiday
- Johns Hopkins
- Mo'Nique Hicks
- Stu Kerr
- Barry Levinson
- Gino Marchetti
- H. L. Mencken
- Brooks Robinson
- Al Sanders
- Jerry Turner (anchorman)
- Plug Uglies
- Edgar Allan Poe
- William Donald Schaefer
- Spank Rock
- Johnny Unitas
- John Waters
- Edward Witten
- Frank Zappa
- Cass Elliot
- Yaakov Weinberg
- Yaakov Yitzchak Ruderman
- Walter P. Carter
- Michael Phelps

=== Places ===
- American Brewery
- Baltimore Basilica
- Baltimore Convention Center
- Baltimore Zoo
- Bromo-Seltzer Tower
- Chesapeake Bay
- Civic Center
- Downtown Baltimore
- Flag House
- Fort McHenry
- Great Blacks in Wax Museum
- Hochschild Kohn's
- Johns Hopkins Hospital
- Hutzler's
- Inner Harbor
- Lexington Market
- List of Baltimore neighborhoods
- Memorial Stadium
- Senator Theatre
- Peabody Bookshop and Beer Stube
- The Shot Tower
- Sparrows Point Shipyard
- Stewart's

=== Things ===
- Baltimore Club
- The Baltimore Colts (1947–50) and Baltimore Colts (1953–1983)
- The Baltimore Ravens
- Baltimore News-American
- Baltimorese
- The Baltimore Banner
- Baltimore Brew
- The Baltimore Sun
- Blue crabs
- Clipper City
- Delphian Club
- Duckpin bowling
- Formstone
- HonFest
- Know-Nothing Riot of 1856
- Kinetic Sculpture Race
- Music of Baltimore
- National Bohemian
- Old Bay Seasoning
- Pride of Baltimore
- Screen painting
- STX
- The "O's"
- Under Armour
