= HonFest =

Annual festival in Baltimore, Maryland, US

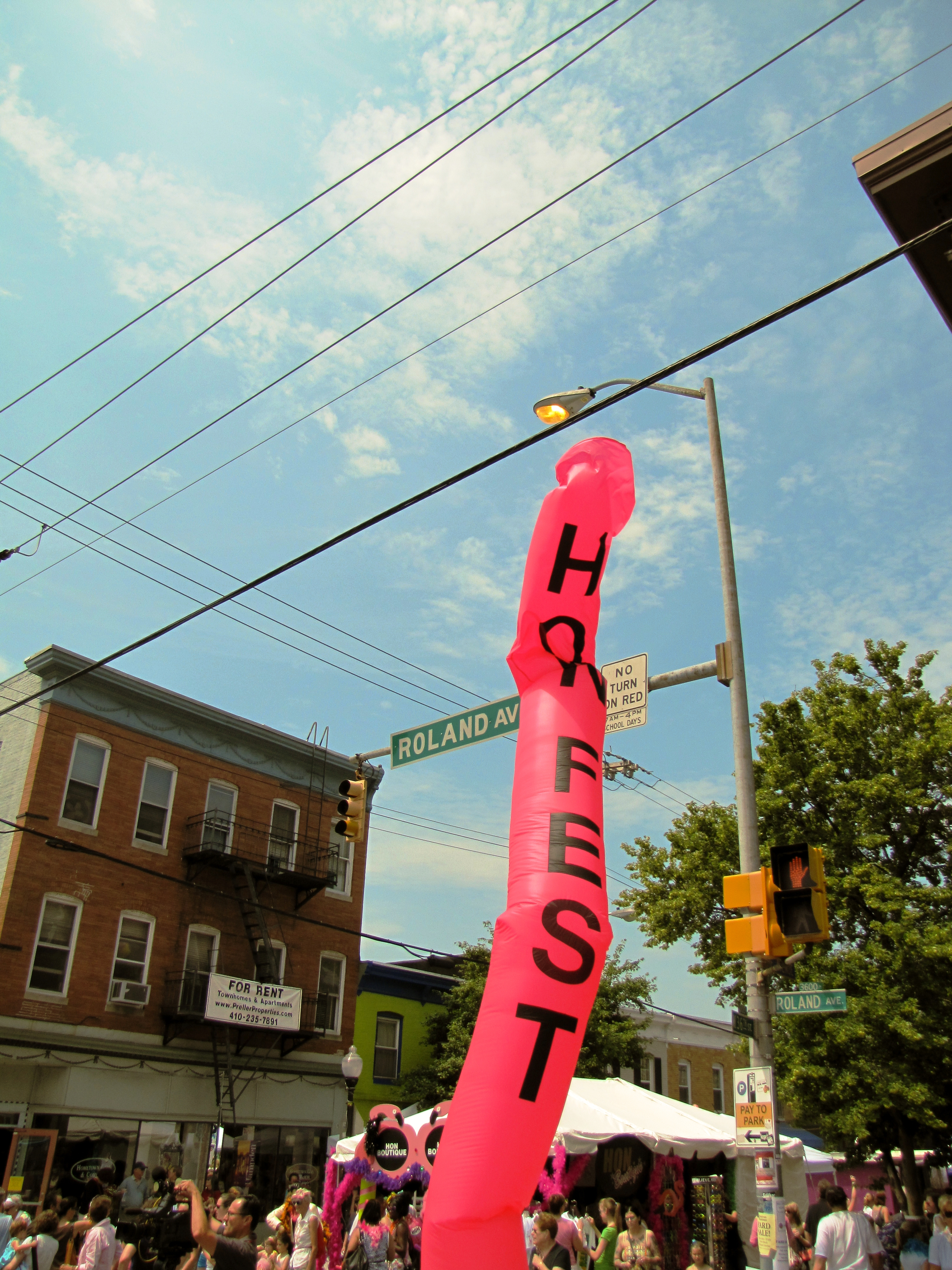
2010 HonFest

HonFest was an annual festival held in the Hampden neighborhood of Baltimore, Maryland, U.S. HonFest takes its name from the word "hon", short for "honey", a term of endearment and greeting often used in "Baltimorese". The festival began in 1994 as a local celebration of the Baltimorese lifestyle and stereotype, and has become one of the most visited festivals in Baltimore. The summer festival originally started as a one-day event, but it became two days starting in 2007, and is held on a Saturday and Sunday. The festival holds a contest in which people dress up as a Baltimore "hon" in a 1960s-style beehive hairdo and sunglasses and other over-stylized clothes and makeup, such as, bright eye shadow, spandex pants, and leopard print clothing, and the winner is crowned "Miss Hon".

== History ==
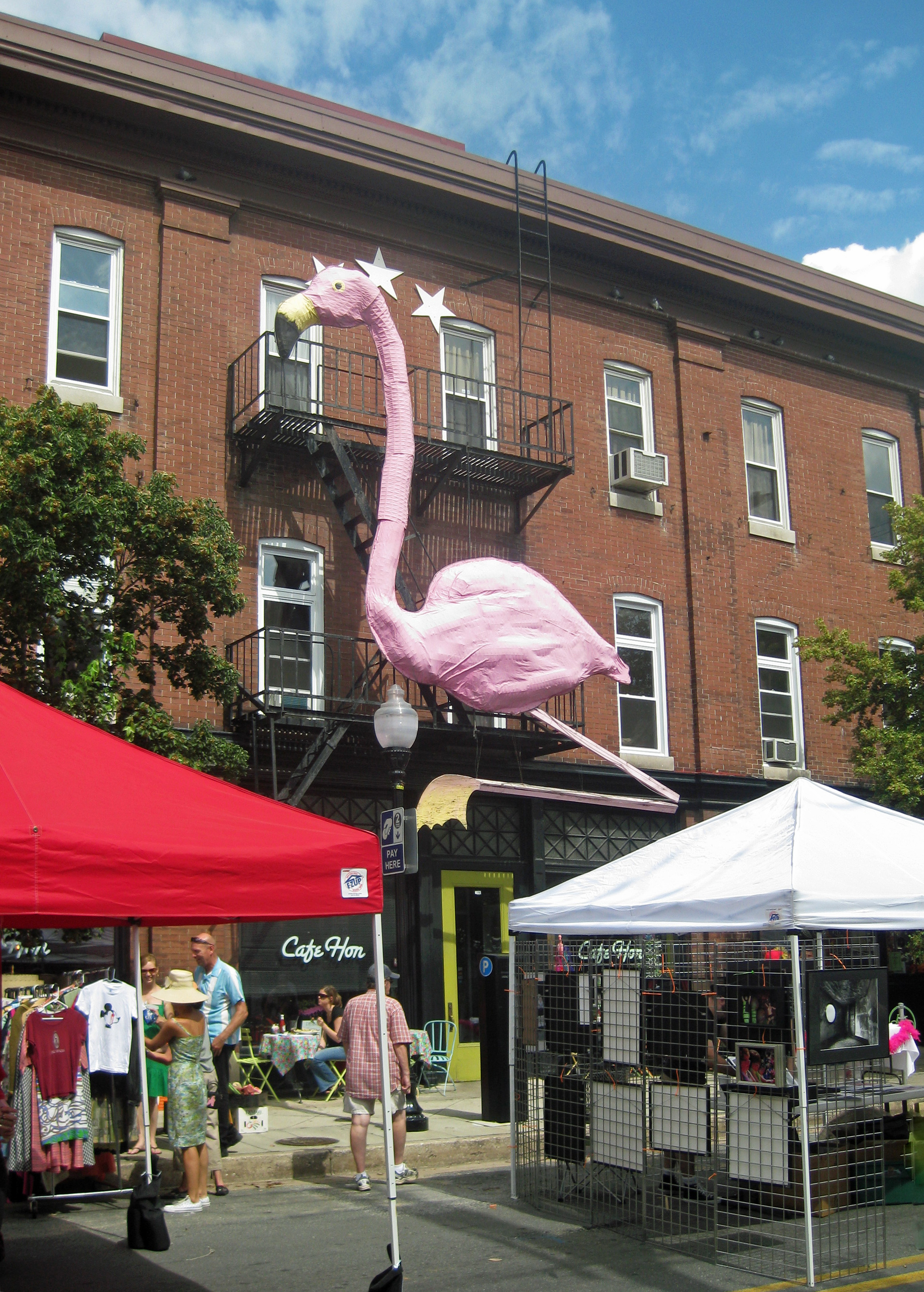
Cafe Hon at HonFest

HonFest began in 1994, originally serving as a marketing tool for Cafe Hon. The festival started off as a one-day event, but since 2007 it has become a weekend-long event. Covering four city blocks of Hampden’s 36th street, The Baltimore Sun claims that HonFest is Baltimore’s most popular neighborhood festival, attracting numbers in the range of 50,000 attendees. As of 2012, three stages are available for entertainment including the main stage, the stage on Falls Road, and the Bacardi Lounge Umbrella Radio stage. The festival boasts the performances of local musical guest covering genres from blues, electronic, alternative rock, and folk. The participants of the event are encouraged to talk in Bawlmerese, the town’s take on Hon dialect.

The 2020 HonFest, the 27th, went virtual.

== Controversy ==
John Waters, whose films were a major influence, has sworn off the festival altogether. "To me, it's used up... It's condescending now. The people that celebrate it are not from it. I feel that in some weird way they're looking slightly down on it. I only celebrate something I can look up to." Some see the festival as perpetuating tired and outdated stereotypes. "...it’s not just that people are mimicking or parodying the past; there’s also an element of class ridicule involved (since the style, taste, and speech associated with working-class women are being fetishized and parodied by other, often wealthier, women). This brings up a number of questions: Is this just good-hearted fun? Is it truly honoring these women, or mocking them? Does it bring attention to Baltimore’s working class residents, or simply treat them like they are historic relics?" The documentary "People Like Us" features a segment depicting Honfest and draws question to whether the middle class participants celebrate or mock the working class culture of old Baltimore.

== See also ==
- Culture of Baltimore
