= Halethorpe, Maryland =

Unincorporated community in Maryland, United States

- Unincorporated community
- Motto: "Life is heaven in 21227"
- Location within the State of Maryland
- Coordinates: 39°14′23″N 76°40′49″W
- Country: United States
- State: Maryland
- County: Baltimore
- Established: June 12, 1893
- Time zone: UTC−5 (Eastern (EST))
  - Summer (DST): UTC−4 (EDT)
- ZIP code: 21227

Halethorpe is an unincorporated community in Baltimore County, Maryland, United States. The community is considered to be a sub-section of Arbutus by the United States Census Bureau. It is bordered by the main portion of Arbutus to the north, Baltimore to the North East, Elkridge to the South West, and Linthicum to the East. It is southeast of the University of Maryland, Baltimore County.

== Fire protection ==
Halethorpe is home to the Baltimore County Fire Department's Station 5, located on the corner of Washington Boulevard and Halethorpe Farms Road.

== Economy ==
There is a large Alcoa aluminum extrusion plant in Halethorpe that used to be part of Kaiser Aluminum.

The Clipper City Brewing Company, the brewer of Heavy Seas Beer, is located on Hollins Ferry Road in Halethorpe.

== Education ==
Halethorpe has one public school, Halethorpe Elementary. Halethorpe has one non-denominational Christian school, Lamb of God School.

== Public transportation ==
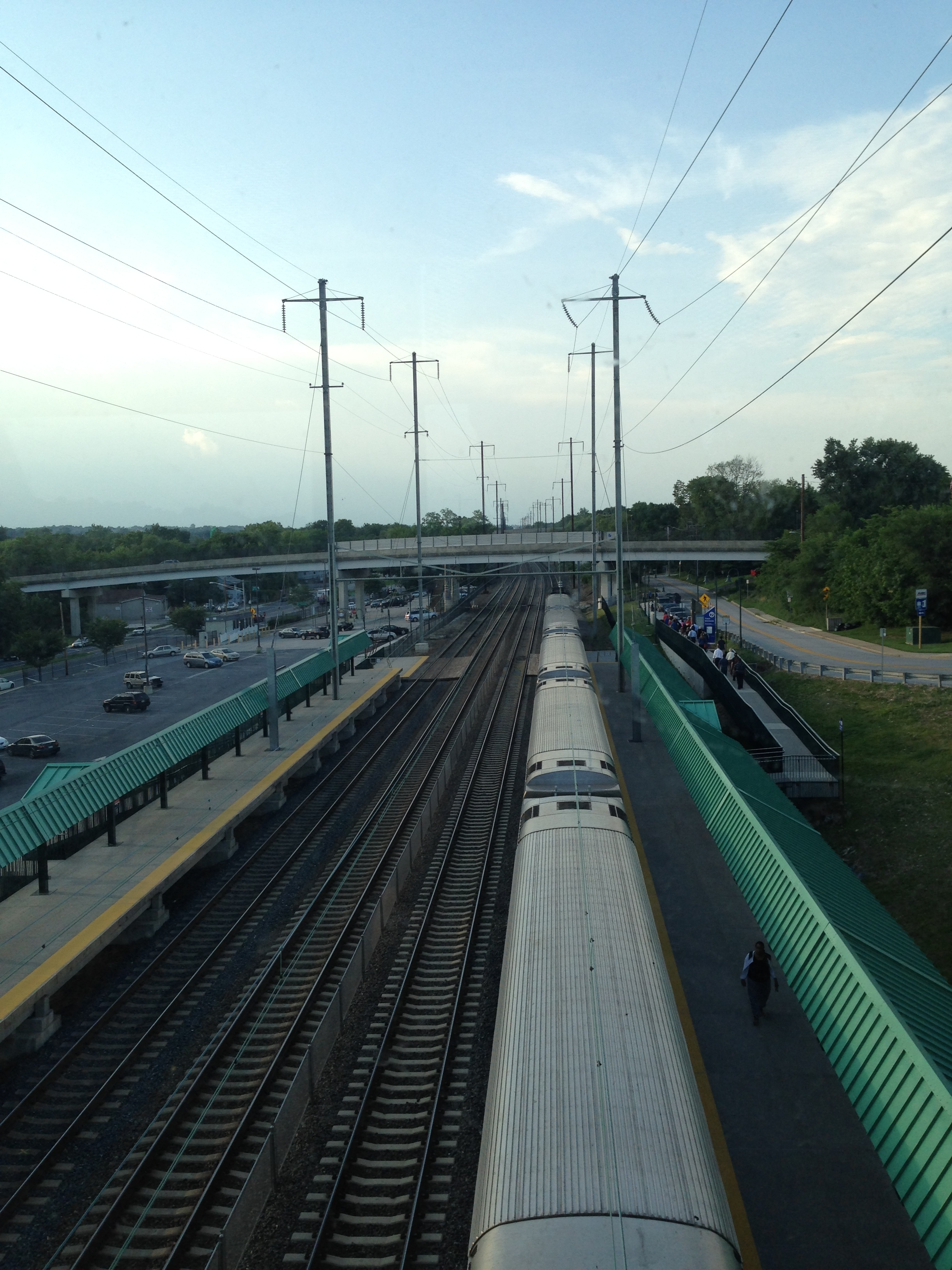
Looking north at a train departing from Halethorpe Station

The Halethorpe community is served by the no. 77 bus line operated by the Maryland Transit Administration.

Halethorpe station on the MARC Penn Line on Southwestern Boulevard serves the Halethorpe-Arbutus community. The Maryland Transit Administration and the University of Maryland, Baltimore County provide bus service to the station.

== Fair of the Iron Horse (1927) ==
Halethorpe was the site of the Baltimore and Ohio Railroad's 1927 centenary celebration, the Fair of the Iron Horse.
