= Cafe Hon =

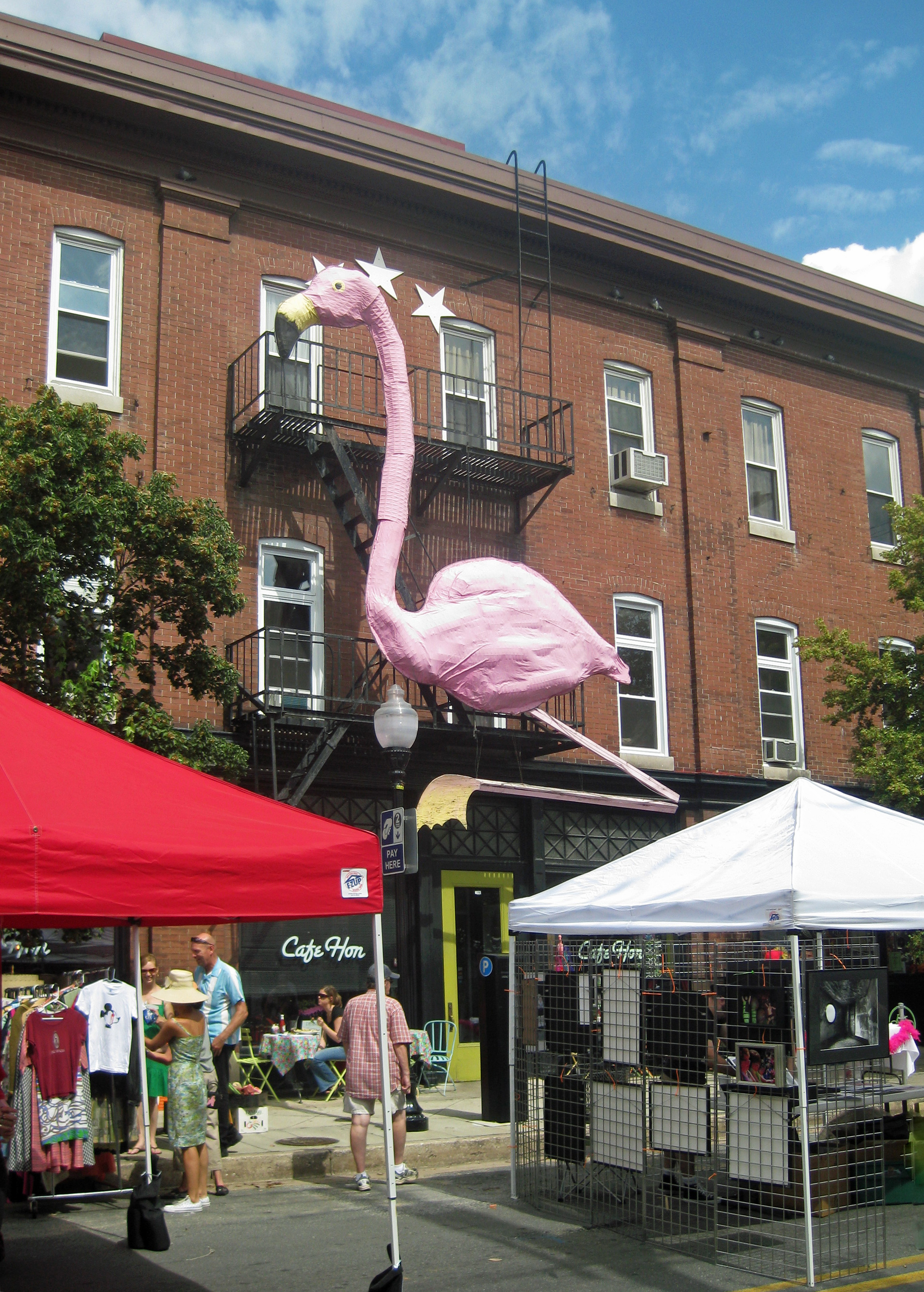
- Cafe Hon, with the flamingo
- Interactive map of Cafe Hon

Restaurant information
- Established: 1992
- Closed: 2022
- Owner: Denise Whiting
- Location: 1002 West 36th Street, Baltimore, Maryland, 21211-2415, United States
- Coordinates: 39.331157°N 76.632920°W
- Website: www.cafehon.com

Cafe Hon was a restaurant in the Hampden area of Baltimore, Maryland.

== History ==
Opened by Denise Whiting in 1992, Cafe Hon takes its name from a common term of endearment ("hon" is an abbreviated version of the word "honey") used by Baltimore residents for years. In 2010, Whiting announced the opening of HONtown, a gift shop across the street from the restaurant. In 2014, the gift shop relocated to a smaller space next door to the restaurant.

On February 24, 2012, Cafe Hon was featured in an episode of the Fox network's Kitchen Nightmares with Gordon Ramsay.

The restaurant closed in 2022, after Whiting leased the space to Foreman Wolf Restaurant Group. Whiting said the iconic flamingo sculpture will find a new home after the restaurant's departure.

== Flamingo ==
In 2002, the distinct flamingo sculpture was introduced above the restaurant, created by local artist Randall Gornowich. The original flamingo was made of wire and cloth.

In October 2009, the city of Baltimore announced the Cafe Hon had to either get a permit for the flamingo at a cost of $1300 for the first year and $800 each year thereafter or to take it down. The issue was that the flamingo protruded into the public right-of-way. The bird was temporarily removed while this case was being disputed.

Whiting stated that the flamingo was "hibernating" during its time of absence, and was determined to fight the city. Whiting and the city finally reached an agreement, in which the permit fee would be at least $400 a year, and the flamingo returned.

The new flamingo that was introduced is made of fiberglass.

Then-Mayor Sheila Dixon was present at the unveiling of the new flamingo. Following Dixon's trial on corruption charges, Elaine Pollack, known as "Juror no. 11" during the trial, came under fire as it was later learned that she was present during the unveiling of the flamingo along with Dixon. This was one of Dixon's last public appearances before her resignation.

== "Hon" as a trademark ==
In November 2010, Whiting trademarked the term "hon" for use on napkins, buttons, hats and other promotional material to promote Cafe Hon. The trademark, as stated by Whiting, does not prevent anyone from saying "hon" or using it in general conversation. The trademark issue was criticized by Dan Rodricks, columnist for The Baltimore Sun: "You can't own something that doesn't belong to you.... 'Hon' isn't unique to Denise Whiting, no matter how special she wants us to believe she is." The dispute prompted street protests on December 19, 2010, by Baltimore residents.

On November 7, 2011, during the taping for Kitchen Nightmares, Whiting held a press conference with Gordon Ramsay present where she announced that she would be relinquishing the "Hon" trademark. Ramsay said that, with Cafe Hon, "There was a level of hatred that was almost untouchable. I've never known a restaurant to have such a huge issue." The Cafe Hon episode of Kitchen Nightmares was briefly described in a Baltimore Sun article, stating that while a typical episode features "slovenly kitchens and indolent staffs," the Cafe Hon episode dealt with a "unique" public relations issue, "one woman vs. a city." Whiting said that the controversy over trademarking the word "Hon" had a huge toll on her business and her own health. Since it was first revealed in December 2010 that "Hon" was trademarked to her, she estimated a "20 to 25 percent drop off" in sales and that she needed to sell her individual retirement accounts (IRAs) just to meet payroll.

Whiting filed to have the trademark canceled and announced it on Facebook on November 11, 2011.
