= Hampden, Baltimore =

Hampden
- Neighborhood of Baltimore
- Location within Baltimore
- Country: United States
- State: Maryland
- City: Baltimore
- Named after: John Hampden
- Time zone: UTC-5 (Eastern)
  - Summer (DST): EDT
- ZIP code: 21211
- Area code: 410, 443, and 667

- Hampden Historic District
- U.S. National Register of Historic Places
- U.S. Historic district
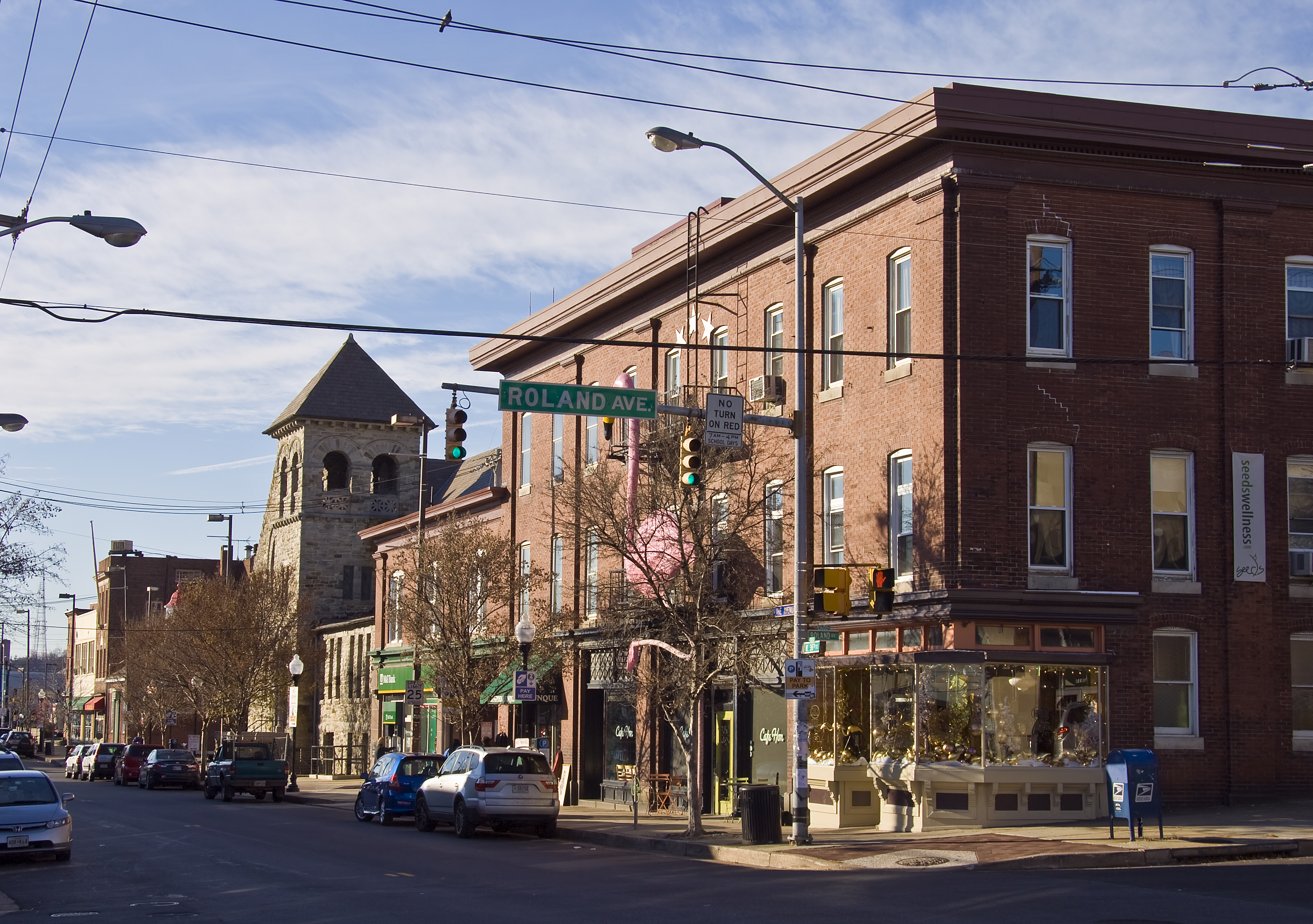
- Hampden commercial district at 36th and Roland Ave.

- Location within Baltimore Location within Maryland Location within the United States
- Location: Roughly bounded by Jones Falls, W. 40th St. and Wyman Park, Baltimore, Maryland
- Coordinates: 39°19′57″N 76°37′57″W
- Area: 400 acres (160 ha)
- Architectural style: Federal, Greek Revival, et al.
- NRHP reference No.: 04001405
- Added to NRHP: December 29, 2004

Hampden is a neighborhood located in northern Baltimore, Maryland, United States. Roughly triangular in shape, it is bounded to the east by the neighborhood Wyman Park, to the north by Roland Park at 40th and 41st Street, to the west by the Jones Falls Expressway, and to the south by the neighborhood Remington. The Homewood campus of the Johns Hopkins University is a short distance to the east.

== History ==
Named for English politician John Hampden, Hampden was originally settled as a residential community for workers at the mills that had sprung up along the Jones Falls; its first residents were in place well before the area was annexed to Baltimore City in 1889. Many of its residents migrated to the area from the Appalachian hill country of Kentucky, West Virginia, and Western Pennsylvania, due to the abundance of jobs the mills provided. This influx cemented the image of the neighborhood for the decades that followed as both primarily white and working-class. Before, during, and after World War II, many Appalachian migrants settled in Baltimore, including Hampden. Appalachian people who migrated to Hampden were largely economic migrants who came looking for work.

In the early '60s into the '80s, Hampden was viewed as a safe place to raise a family. Most of its residents knew each other through the local schools, namely Hampden Elementary #55 and Robert Poole Middle School #56. Local grocery stores included the A&P located on Falls Road and Ezee Market located where the current Wine Source is located on Chestnut Avenue. Athletic programs were orchestrated via the Roosevelt Recreation Center for children of all ages. These included the football Hampden Rangers, baseball and indoor basketball. The "Rec", as known by the locals, included a "Big Pool" which is still in use today, and offered a summer fireworks celebration on the 4th of July. Restaurants were plentiful, including Ye Eat Shoppe, Roland Restaurant and Reynolds on The Avenue. Also on The Avenue were the Ideal and Hampden Theaters, showcasing the latest movies. This family atmosphere lasted into the late 80s, ultimately giving way to gentrification and a real estate surge that allowed its long-time residents to relocate.

Beginning in the early 1990s, the neighborhood (conveniently located vis-a-vis Johns Hopkins and downtown) was discovered by artists and others, who began reclaiming the neighborhood. Many new residents were attracted by the creation of an artist studio and office space known as the Mill Centre, located in the southernmost region of Hampden between Falls Road and Mill Road. Over the past decade, housing prices in Hampden have skyrocketed. The area's commercial center on a four-block stretch of West 36th Street, known as The Avenue, has seen trendy boutiques, restaurants, art galleries, a yoga studio, an upscale winebar, and assorted specialty shops occupy storefronts that had been either vacant or in a state of disrepair. The community of Wyman Park, as well as the actual park, are located to the east. The Woodberry station on the Baltimore Light Rail system is just on the other side of the Jones Falls Expressway and is within walking distance of much of the neighborhood. A new, high-end mixed-use development at Clipper Mill, directly in front of the Woodberry Light Rail station, has spurred additional economic activity in the area.

== Culture ==
Baltimore has in recent years embraced certain aspects of old Hampden's traditional culture. The neighborhood is home to the annual "Hon Festival" (also called HonFest), named after the term "Hon," a term of endearment. HonFest features attendees who tease their hair into the enormous beehive hairdos of the 1960s. The festival also features a contest to find the best "Bawlmerese," a variation of Baltimore's unique traditional accent. This accent is also more commonplace in areas like Dundalk and Essex. In March 2011, the Special English service of Voice of America broadcast "Hey, Hon, Ready to Learn How They Talk in Baltimore?" and "An Extended Lesson in Bawlmerese" by Baltimore native Steve Ember. Prior to HonFest, the annual festival was known as the "May Fair", and lasted a full week beginning in early May.

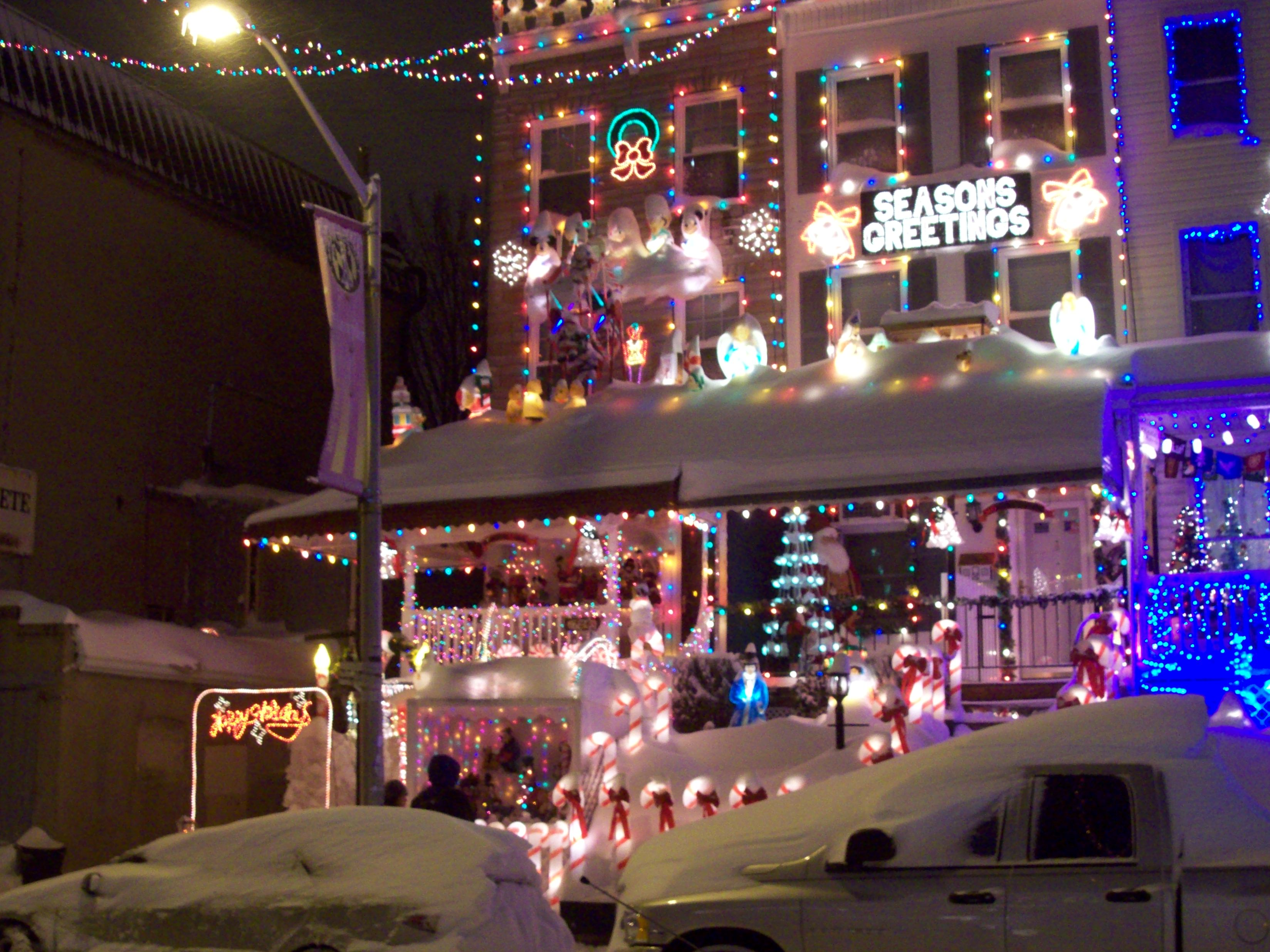
Christmas decorations on 34th Street block in Hampden

Hampden's 34th Street near the southern end of the neighborhood celebrates the Christmas holiday every year with the "Miracle on 34th Street" where home owners on both sides of the street decorate their houses with thousands of lights and Christmas decorations.

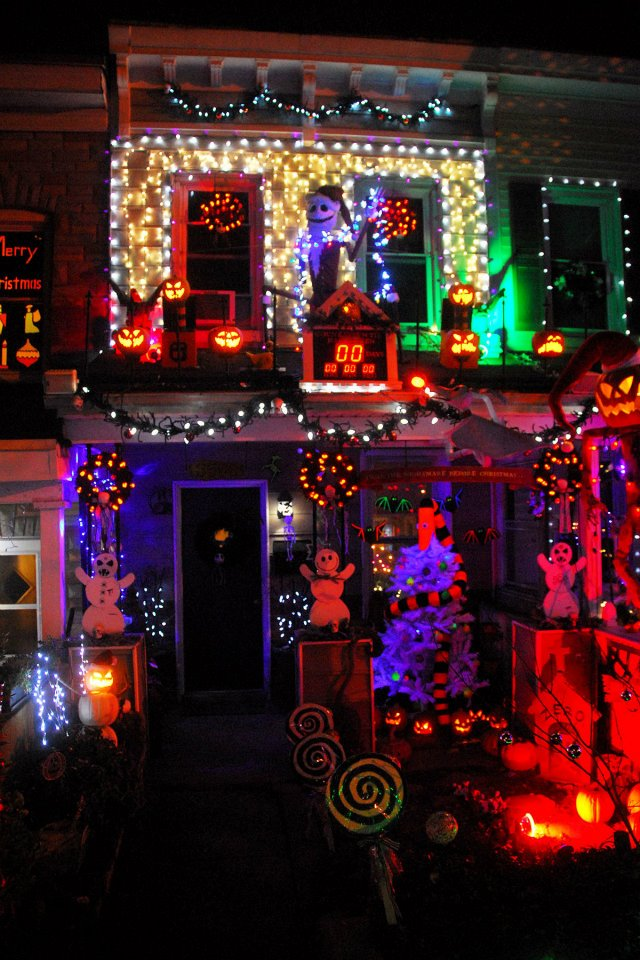
The "Halloween House", which has synchronized lights during the Christmas season

Hampden received perhaps its most prominent nationwide exposure in 1998, when Baltimore native John Waters filmed his movie Pecker there. Starring Edward Furlong, Christina Ricci, Martha Plimpton, and Lili Taylor, the film depicted an elaborate and fictional view of Hampden and its young residents.

The novelist Philipp Meyer grew up on Hampden's 36th Street during the late 1970s and 1980s. Much of his novel American Rust was reportedly influenced by his childhood there.

== Housing architecture ==
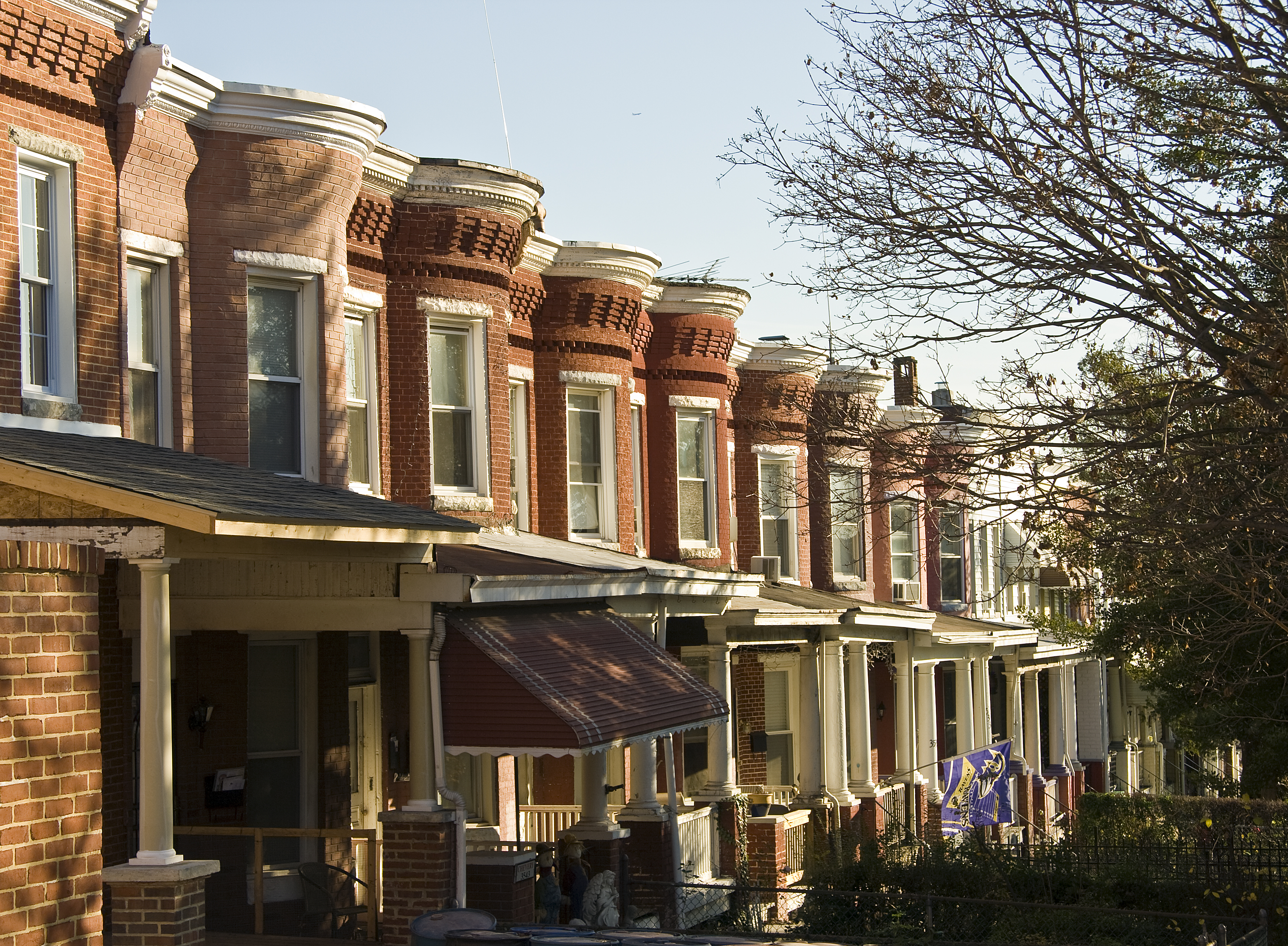
Row houses on Roland Avenue

As Hampden was originally a center of mills and factories, much of its original structures were built to house workers. Small two-story row houses, made out of brick or stone, were built to hold families of mill workers. Larger houses, many built with stone, were built for managers and upper level staff. More modern housing was built around the edges of the Hampden area. In the 20th century, apartment complexes were built around Roland Avenue and north of Hampden.

There are few areas amenable to further development in the neighborhood, a factor in the rising housing costs in the area. Hampden was forecasted to "see the most home value appreciation in 2013" in the city. This has led to many rehab projects of existing housing stock. However, a large mixed-use development began construction in late 2013 in North Hampden, at the site of the Rotunda Shopping Center. The size and scale of this development has created some controversy in this neighborhood, mostly concerning congestion in car traffic and parking as nearly 400 new apartments and numerous businesses, including a high-end movie theatre, opened in 2015.

== Landmarks and schools ==
Local Hampden landmarks include an original branch of the Enoch Pratt Free Library, Burgee Hess Funeral Home, St. Thomas Aquinas Catholic Church, St. Luke's Lutheran Church, and Hampden School #55.

== Background ==
Hampden first came into being in 1802 as a cluster of houses built for workers who manned the newly erected flour and cotton mills along the Jones Falls Stream Valley. The creation of such mills helped spur the growth of the port of Baltimore, which exported the grains milled in Hampden. In 1810, the first cotton mill was opened on the Jones Falls by Washington Manufacturing Company in what is now Mount Washington. The most important mills and factories in the area included the Mt. Vernon Mills (later the Mt. Vernon-Woodberry Mills), the Hooper Mills, and the Poole & Hunt Foundry. Many residents were employed at the nearby mills and lived in neighborhood rowhouses. The mills were built along the Jones Falls waterway, much of which is now underneath Interstate 83, running ultimately to downtown Baltimore and the Inner Harbor. Churches, community centers, marketplaces, and shops were built to support the community. In 1899, industrialist Robert Poole built branch No. 7 of the Enoch Pratt Library and gave the library to the city of Baltimore. Hampden was annexed by the city of Baltimore in 1889.

Hampden's economic power grew throughout the 19th century fueled by the cotton mills. At the turn of the 20th century, the workers of Hampden-Woodberry made up one of the largest workforces in the nation. During the first decade of the century, several labor strikes resulted in improved wages and working conditions in Baltimore. During World War I, the demand for cotton duck kept the mills operating at full capacity. In the 1920s, more labor strikes occurred, this time focused on pay increases and better working hours. The strikes turned out to be unsuccessful and mill owners began to move operations to the rural South—in search of lower labor costs. The mills in Hampden-Woodberry were able to weather this setback and production at the mills increased to fuel the war effort during World War II. Unfortunately, the 1960s and 1970s saw the demise of the mills as demand for their products dried up.

As with many industrial areas and cities, Hampden experienced a downturn during the later half of the last century. Many factories and mills were either closed or relocated—forcing workers to seek employment elsewhere and supporting businesses to cease operations. During the 1970s and 1980s, many residents felt the area endured a long-term economic downturn. During this period, crime and drug usage increased along with changes in the dynamic of social life in Hampden. Like other areas of Baltimore, school dropout rates increased while illegal drugs and prostitution became prevalent.

Today, Hampden is experiencing a great period of revival and upward development. Since the early 1990s, an influx of new residents and business owners have been the catalyst to the neighborhood's current thriving renewal. Many tourists and visitors now travel to 36th Street to dine, shop, visit art galleries, and experience the neighborhood. Houses are now in greater demand in Hampden and many are being renovated and restored. Commercial buildings along the Avenue have also been receiving facelifts in recent years, reflecting a range of historical architecture styles. Improvements at Roosevelt Park on Falls Road include a refurbished recreation center with a skate park and completely renovated pool complex. Bus lines and the Light Rail have helped to open up Hampden for residents and visitors.

== Public transit ==
The Maryland Transit Administration serves Hampden via Baltimore Light Rail at Woodberry Station on Union Avenue and bus routes 21, 22, 94, and 95.

== See also ==
- List of Baltimore neighborhoods
