= Southern Society =

Former American periodical

Southern Society was an American magazine published from 1867 to 1868, in Baltimore. According to Frank Luther Mott, it had "a list of superior contributors".
