= Continental Magazine =

American magazine published in 1883, in Baltimore, by A. C. Meyer

Continental Magazine was an American magazine published in 1883, in Baltimore, by A. C. Meyer.
