= Rheb's Candies =

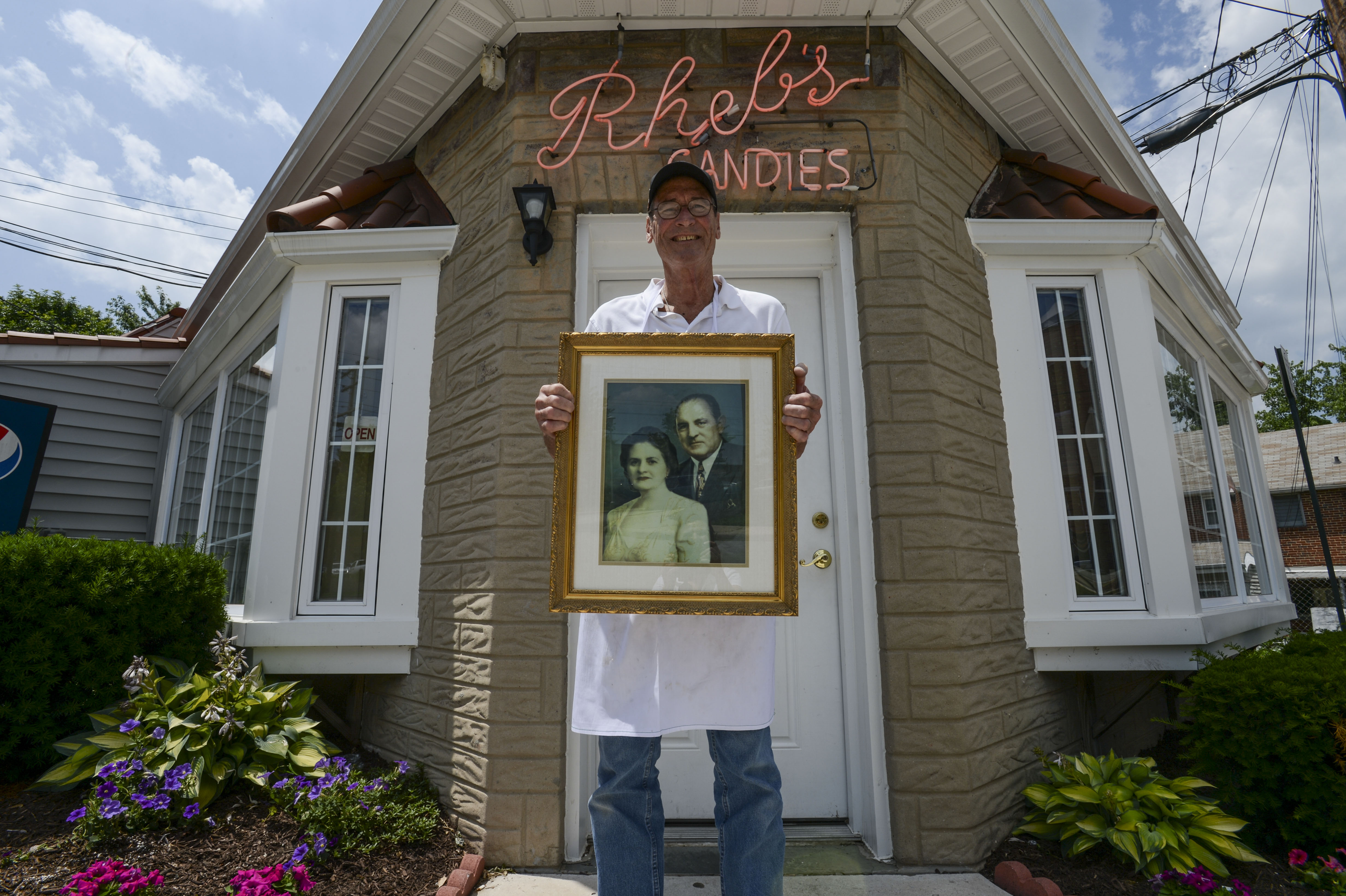
- Rheb's in 2014
- Interactive map of Rheb's Candies

Restaurant information
- Established: 1917
- Previous owners: Louis and Esther Rheb
- Location: 3352 Wilkens Avenue, Baltimore, Maryland, 21229
- Website: rhebs.com

Rheb's Candies is a family-owned confectionery business based in Baltimore, Maryland. Established in 1917, the company has been producing handmade chocolates and other sweets for over a century, maintaining its operations at its original location on Wilkens Avenue.

== Description ==
Rheb's Candies operates from a small shop located behind the founders' original home, which also houses its candy-making facilities. The production process involves traditional, labor-intensive techniques, including hand-dipping centers into chocolate and manually adjusting the temperature of melted chocolate. Many of the machines used in production are decades old and have been a part of the company's operation since its early days.

The company employs both family members and long-term staff, many of whom have worked there for decades. One example is Elmer Wingert, a long-time employee who has worked for Rheb's for over 37 years.

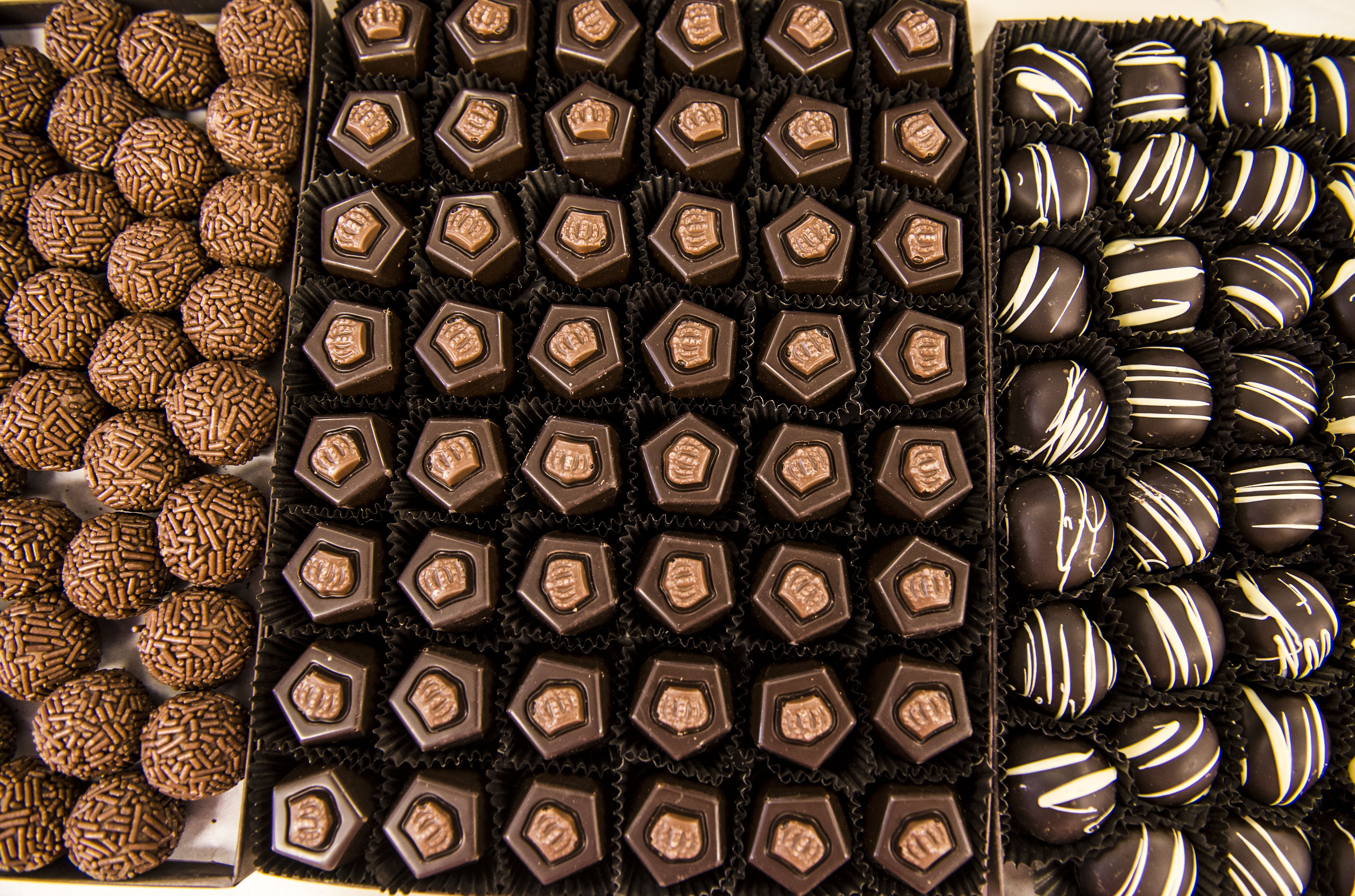
Rheb's Candy signature truffle sits next to other truffles in a display case to be sold, June 18, 2014.

=== Menu ===
The shop offers a wide range of handmade confections, including buttercreams, truffles, sea salt caramels, and chocolate-covered cherries. Seasonal items such as heart-shaped chocolates for Valentine's Day and chocolate bunnies for Easter. Customers also enjoy classics like peanut butter fudge and almond paste treats.

In 1997, Rheb's made specialty milk chocolate crabs that were carried aboard the Space Shuttle Columbia by astronaut Roger K. Crouch. These chocolates traveled over 1.5 million miles during the mission.

== History ==
In 1917, newlyweds Louis and Esther Rheb moved into their new home at 3352 Wilkens Avenue in Baltimore, Maryland where they founded Rheb's Candies. Louis, self-taught, started making taffies, brittles, fudge, and jellies in his basement. The candies were sold in the markets twice a week, Esther going to Hollins and Louis to Bel Air Market. They sold their candies in small white bags.

In the mid-1930s, they opened in Lexington Market. Louis continued to develop more recipes, and Esther learned to hand-dip the centers in a smooth and velvety chocolate that they had blended to complement each piece of candy. Many people came to Wilkens Avenue to buy candy, so they converted their garage into a store. The grand opening took place in 1950.

In 1953, the Rheb family expanded their operations by building a small shop behind their original house on Wilkens Avenue. This shop served as a retail outlet and became the company's flagship location. The basement of the home continued to function as the production site, where candies were hand-dipped and packed.

In 2008, Rheb's closed its stall at Lexington Market due to concerns about market conditions and operational challenges. These included inadequate facilities and a decline in customer traffic. The closure left the Wilkens Avenue location as the sole point of sale for their confections.

== Reception ==
Rheb's Candies has cultivated a loyal customer base over the decades. Customers often describe their products as integral to holiday traditions and personal celebrations. The shop frequently experiences long lines, especially during busy seasons like Christmas and Easter, with customers arriving as early as 4 a.m. to secure their purchases. On Valentine's Day, there is typically a long line of customers outside Rheb's on Wilkens Avenue.

The company has been recognized for its enduring presence in Baltimore. In 2017, proclamations from local officials, including the Mayor of Baltimore and the Baltimore City Council, celebrated Rheb's 100th anniversary.
