= Formstone =

Stucco formed to look like masonry

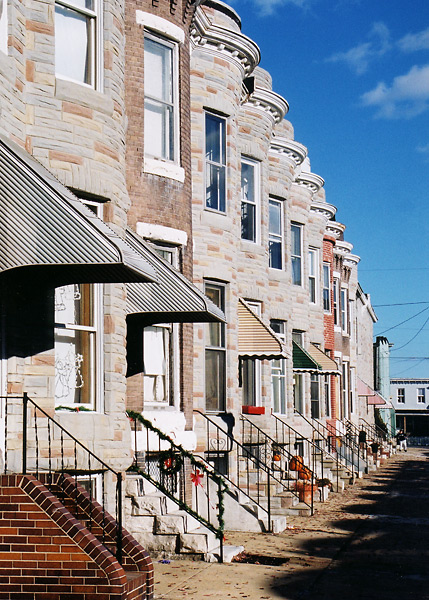
Typical Baltimore formstone-faced rowhouses

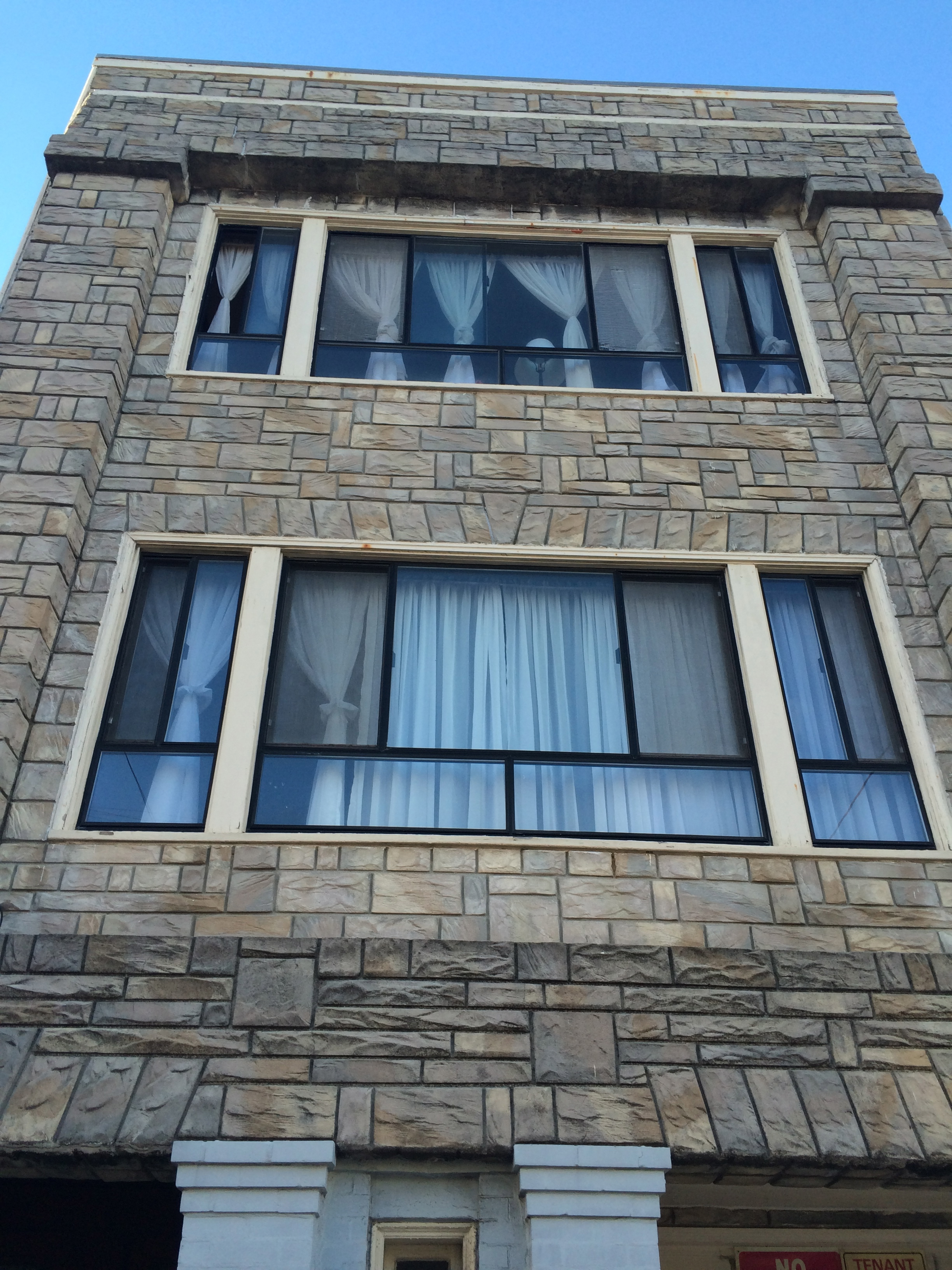
Example of Formstone from Richmond District in San Francisco

Formstone is a type of stucco colored and shaped to imitate masonry. It is strongly associated with Baltimore.

== History and popularity ==
Formstone was patented by Lewis Albert Knight of the Baltimore-based Lasting Products Company in 1937, although a similar product named Permastone had been invented in Columbus, Ohio, eight years prior. The name Formstone was actually a brand name used by Knight. Permastone, Fieldstone, Dixie Stone, and Stone of Ages were names used for a product similar to Knight's Formstone, particularly in other cities.

=== Baltimore ===
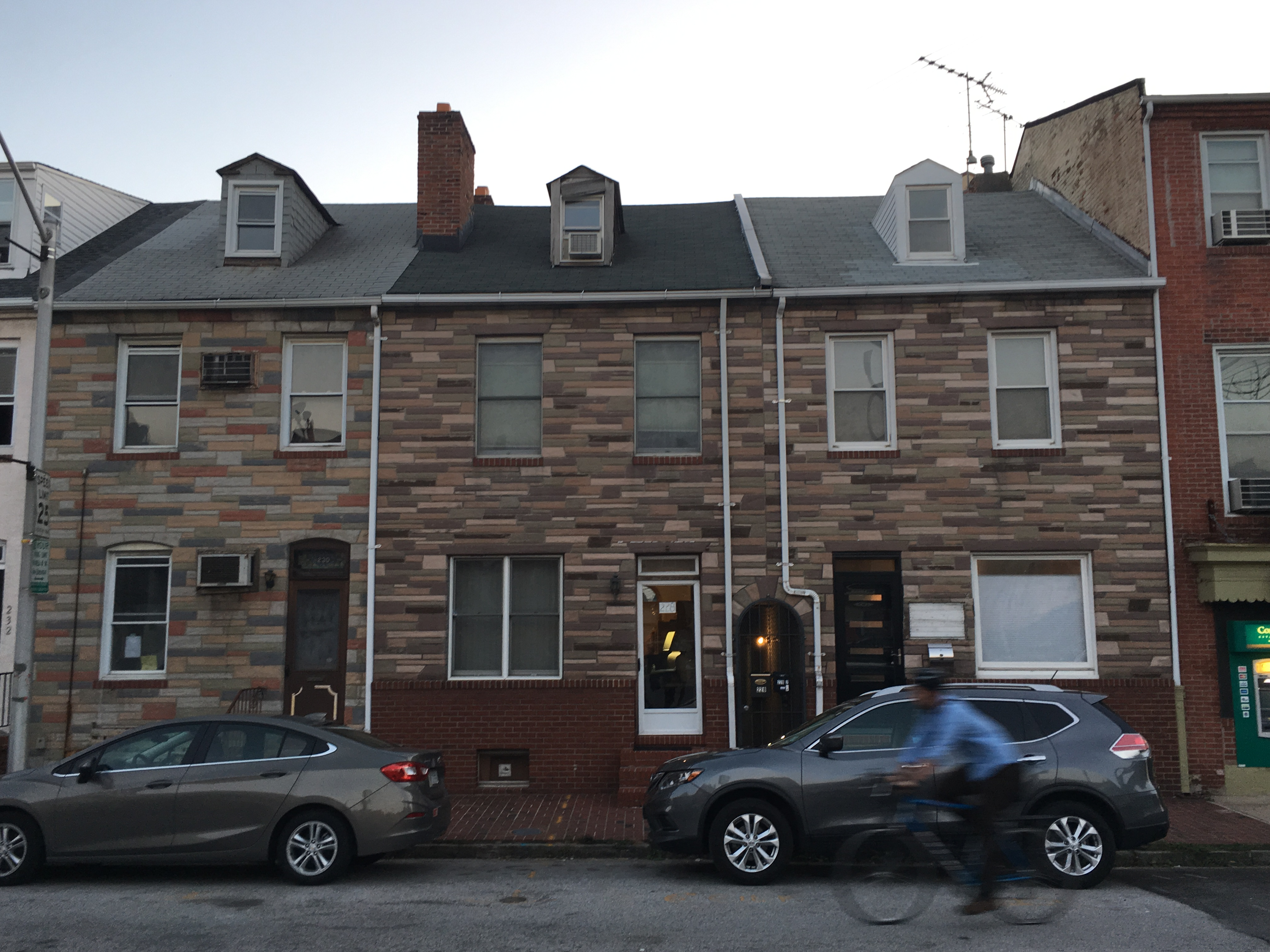
Formstone variations found in the Little Italy neighborhood in Baltimore

Formstone was used widely in Baltimore. Formstone was primarily used in remodeling but could also be used for new construction. Film director and Baltimore native John Waters described Formstone as "the polyester of brick." Baltimore became the “Formstone capital of the world."

The Baltimore-based Lasting Products Company, the parent company of Formstone, was later known as the Formstone Co. Not long after Formstone was invented, the Lasting Products Company disbanded during World War II. When business resumed, the majority of buildings faced in Formstone were single-family homes. It was not long until rowhouse homeowners in more urban and working-class areas of Baltimore wanted the clean and polished look of Formstone. The company opened successful franchise locations in various cities across the United States but Baltimore was the epicenter of the Formstone phenomenon. The company provided all of the tools and materials needed to complete a Formstone project and trained registered contractors on how to sell and apply Formstone. There were many competitors in the 1950s and 1960s, some with salesmen who advertised different materials under the Formstone product name. The competitors used a simulated stone product similar to Formstone but with different variations in patterns, colors, and application.

Formstone’s popularity came from the promise that it was inexpensive, maintenance-free, and more energy-efficient. It also gave Baltimore rowhouses a more modern look. A 1950 advertisement for Formstone revealed the “secret of its popularity: weatherproof and insulating forever; first cost is the last; no upkeep or repair…lasting beauty for exteriors or interiors; tried and proven; fully guaranteed.” Formstone was meant to be a maintenance-free alternative to the low-quality brick that many early Baltimore rowhouses were constructed with. These brick buildings required a lot of upkeep and frequent painting. But for the cost of three paint jobs, Formstone could be applied to the building’s exterior and eliminate much of the effort to maintain the exterior brick.

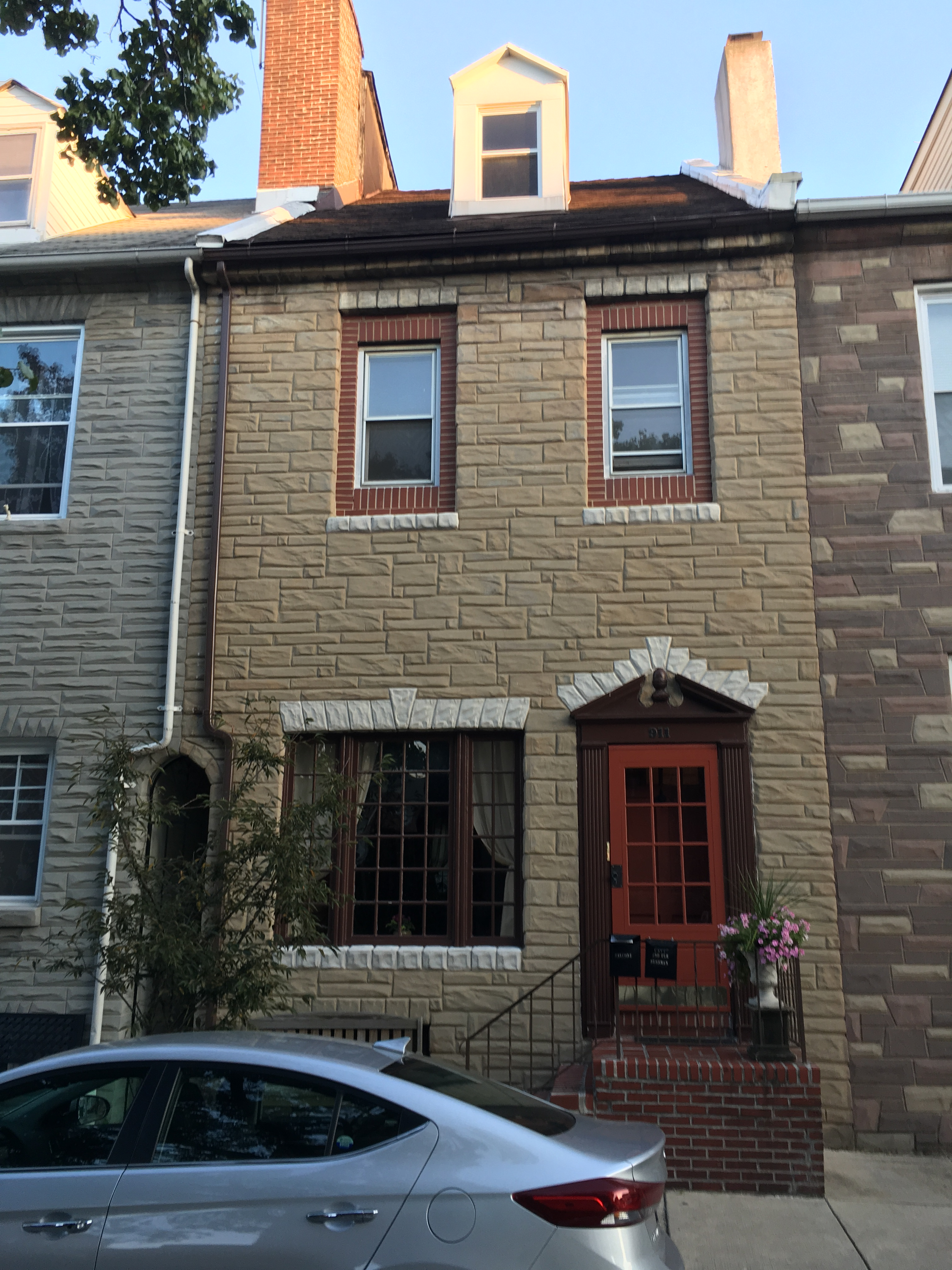
Example of Formstone in the Little Italy neighborhood in Baltimore

At the height of its popularity in the 1950s, Formstone was a sign of wealth and stability in the working class neighborhoods of Baltimore. But the longevity of Formstone was not living up to the company’s promises and the Formstone Co. went out of business in the late 1960s. Aluminum and vinyl siding, much cheaper ways to weather-proof buildings, became more popular and contributed to the decline of Formstone and other simulated stone products.

=== San Francisco ===
Formstone, described as "[a]n odd architectural fad" by urban design critic John King, appeared in San Francisco in the 1930s and '40s. While not particularly common, it is still found around the city. Like San Francisco, in Washington, DC, the same debate over whether it is historic or should be removed continues where it was used to mimic granite and other stone in a rather historic city famous for real stone buildings.

== Application ==
Formstone is mixed on-site and applied directly to a building’s exterior. Knight wanted to provide a process for that used the tools of masonry and cement finishers so they could easily follow the application process. Formstone is applied in three layers, anchored by a perforated metal lath attached to the underlying brick with nails. Galvanized mesh was used in many instances to reduce the likelihood of rusting. The three layers are cement-based concrete. The first layer of cement mortar is 3/8” to 3/4” thick and it is scored before it dries. The second layer is between 1/4” and 3/8” thick. The top layer, or finish layer, is also between 1/4” and 3/8” thick and is applied while the second layer is still plastic. While the finish layer is still wet, it is hand-sculpted into the shape of stones. The finish layer contains the coloration used to imitate stone and is textured using waxed paper and an aluminum roller. Mica could also be sprayed on the surface to give the Formstone a sparkly, clean look. Mortar joints are then scored into the top layer to mimic natural stone construction.

== Preservation issues ==
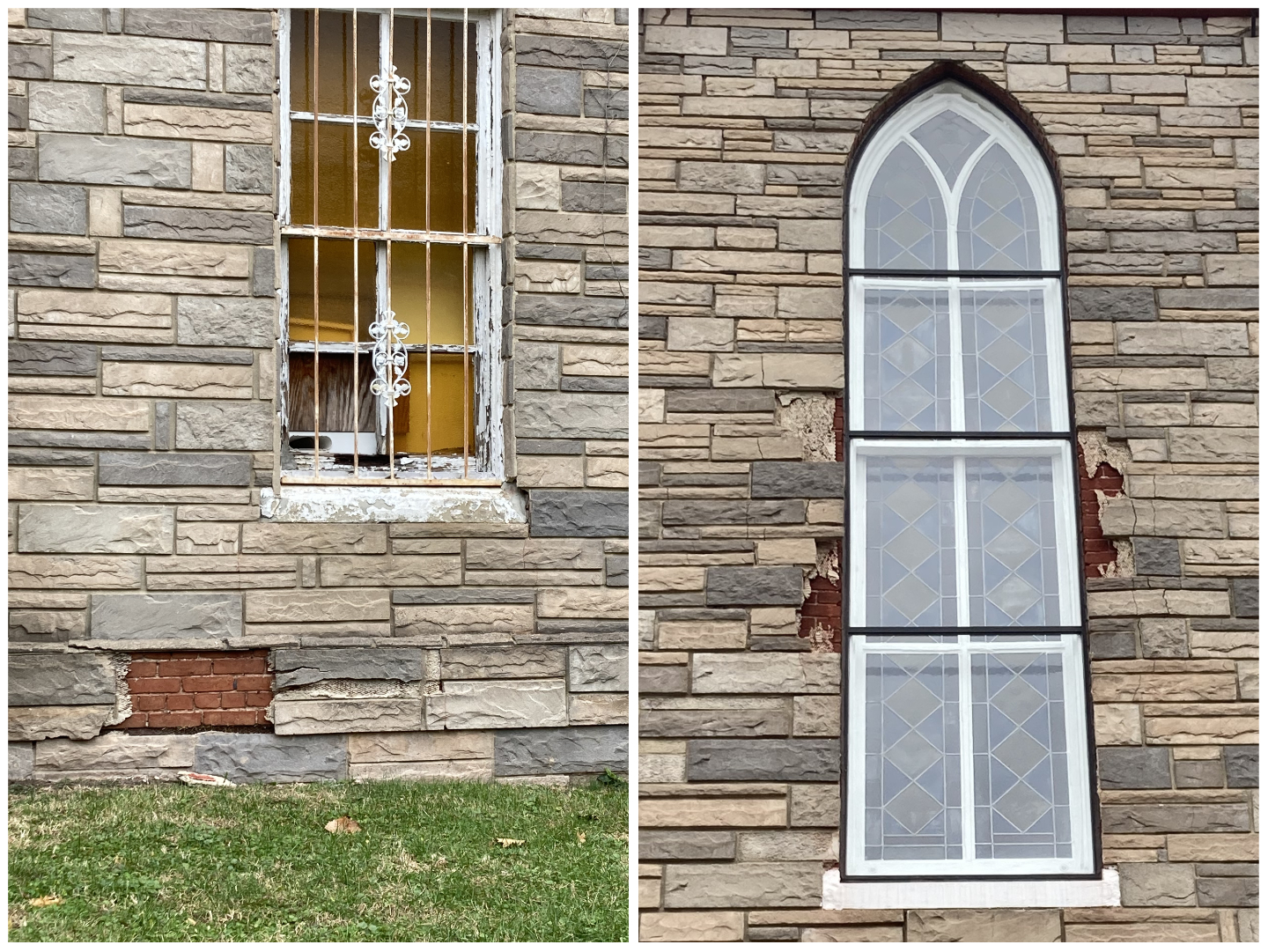
Deteriorating Formstone exposes the underlying bricks at Church of the Resurrection in Washington, D.C.

One major failure of Formstone is that the metal lath holding the faux stone to the building can start to pull away from the brick. Without a strong bond between the Formstone and the underlying brick, moisture is allowed to enter between the two materials and become trapped. Applying Formstone to rowhouses constructed with early brick from the eighteenth and nineteenth centuries caused many problems. This early brick was soft, porous, and susceptible to deterioration. Formstone prevents the historic brick from breathing and the accumulation of moisture causes cracks to form. This moisture combined with the freeze-thaw cycle can damage the Formstone material and, if left uncorrected, can lead to further deterioration and penetration of moisture into the underlying brick. This can lead to spalling, efflorescence, and loosened mortar joints on the brick façade. Formstone is only waterproof as long as it does not deteriorate and separate from the wall.

Another preservation issue stems from the application of the Formstone. When it was applied to the exterior façade of a building, historically significant architectural features were often covered up or removed. Features such as cornices, belt courses, lintels, and sills were not only decorative, they were necessary for diverting water away from the building, leading to even more damage from moisture intrusion.

When a building owner decides to remove the Formstone, historical fabric and significant features can be damaged during this process. When the metal lath is removed, it leaves the original poor quality brick surface pock-marked with holes in the mortar joints. This requires cleaning and repointing of the brick, and sometimes replacement of severely damaged brick, which can be very expensive.

== Historical significance ==
There is debate over the historical significance of Formstone. Because it was usually applied to buildings long after their initial construction, Formstone is viewed by some as an inauthentic addition that detracts from the historical significance of the building. But some historic preservationists, architects, and citizens, particularly in the city of Baltimore, argue that Formstone has acquired its own historical significance as it has become a part of the Baltimore landscape and is representative of the history and evolution of the city’s working-class neighborhoods.
