= Heavy Seas Beer =

Brewed by Clipper City Brewing Company, in Baltimore, Maryland

Coordinates: 39°13′50″N 76°40′31″W

Clipper City Brewing Company
- Industry: Alcoholic beverage
- Founded: 1995
- Founder: Hugh Sisson
- Headquarters: Baltimore, Maryland, United States
- Products: Beer
- Production output: 34,000 barrels/year
- Owner: Hugh Sisson
- Website: www.hsbeer.com

Heavy Seas Beer is brewed by Clipper City Brewing Company, in Baltimore, Maryland. The brewery was established by Hugh Sisson in 1995. Previously, Sisson operated Maryland's first brewpub, Sisson's. In 2010, the brewery rebranded. While the name of the company remains Clipper City Brewing Company, all of its beer falls under the Heavy Seas brand. Heavy Seas hosts tours on most weekends. It is located at 4615 Hollins Ferry Road, Suite B, in the Halethorpe section of Baltimore County.

Heavy Seas offers a variety of beer styles in approximately 18 states within the United States. Several Heavy Seas beers have been awarded and include the following: Cutlass Amber Lager (a repeat medal winner at the Great American Beer Festival from 2006–2010, bronze medal winner at the 2010 World Beer Cup and silver medal winner at the 2012 World Beer Cup as Heavy Seas Märzen), Powder Monkey Pale Ale (silver medal winner at the 2008 Great American Beer Festival and bronze medal winner at the 2010 World Beer Cup as Heavy Seas Pale Ale), Small Craft Warning Uber Pils (bronze medal winner at the 2004 Great American Beer Festival), Gold Ale (gold medal winner at the 2010 World Beer Cup, bronze medal winner at the 2010 Great American Beer Festival and bronze medal winner at the 2014 Great American Beer Festival as Heavy Seas Gold Ale) and Winter Storm Imperial ESB (gold medal winner at the 2008 World Beer Cup).

== History ==
In 1994, Hugh Sisson left his family-owned and -operated brewpub, Sisson's, to focus on brewing beer at a larger scale. Sisson, who is responsible for the legalization of brewpubs in the state of Maryland, originally targeted Baltimoreans as his main consumer base; he intended to fill the niche left open by the relocation of the National Bohemian brand. Clipper City was named after the clipper ship, which was first constructed in Baltimore.

When the craft brewing industry experienced a contraction in the late 1990s, Clipper City resorted to contract brewing to stay afloat financially. In 2003, Clipper City started its Heavy Seas brand—intended for higher gravity beers. The new brand took off; the beers under the Heavy Seas line could sell in more states than could Clipper City beers, limited as they were by insular branding. Due to the steady success of the Heavy Seas brand, Sisson and his crew decided to rebrand Clipper City beers in 2010; the beers under the Clipper City brand now sell as Heavy Seas Gold Ale, Heavy Seas Powder Monkey Pale Ale and Heavy Seas Cutlass Amber Lager.

In 2011, the brewery tacked on 10,000 square foot addition to its 15,000 sq. ft. brewery. Heavy Seas beers sell in 18 states.

In November 2019, Heavy Seas Bear announced the release of their 24 Anniversary Ale, a Quadruple India Pale Ale to celebrate the brewery's 24th year of brewing craft beer in Baltimore.

In November 2026, Clipper City Brewing Company filed for Chapter 11 bankruptcy protection.

== See also ==
- Barrel-aged beer
