= Baltimore accent =

Regional dialect of American English

A Baltimore accent, also known as Baltimorese and sometimes humorously spelled Bawlmerese or Ballimorese, is an accent or sub-variety of Delaware Valley English (a dialect whose largest hub is Philadelphia) that originates among blue-collar residents of Baltimore, Maryland, United States. It extends into the Baltimore metropolitan area and northeastern Maryland.

At the same time, there is considerable linguistic diversity within Baltimore, which complicates the notion of a singular "Baltimore accent". According to linguists, the accent of white blue-collar Baltimoreans is different from the African-American Vernacular English accent of Black Baltimoreans. White working-class families who migrated out of Baltimore to the northwestern suburbs brought local pronunciations with them. In suburbs south of Baltimore, the accent includes over-enunciation of most words, e.g. pronouncing Baltimore, "Ball-Tee-More."

== Pronunciation ==
The Baltimore accent that originated among white blue-collar residents closely resembles and is virtually indistinguishable from blue-collar Philadelphia-area English pronunciation. These two cities are the only major ports on the Eastern Seaboard never to have developed non-rhotic speech among European American speakers; they were greatly influenced in their early development by Hiberno-English, Scottish English, and West Country English. Due to the significant similarity between the speeches of Baltimore, Philadelphia, Delaware and southern New Jersey, sociolinguists refer to them collectively as the Mid-Atlantic regional dialect. In Baltimore accents, sounds around /r/ are often "smoothed" or elided. For example, a word like bureau is commonly pronounced /ˈbiroʊ/ (e.g., Federal Beer-o of Investigation) and mirror is pronounced rarely as /mir/ ("mere"); the related mare–mayor merger also exists.

=== Vowels ===
- Several vowels undergo fronting. /aʊ/ fronts to [ɛɔ] or [æɔ]. /uː/ fronts to [ʉu]. Similarly, /oʊ/ shifts to [əʊ] or even [eʊ]. When word-final and spelled as -ow, it is pronounced like /ə/, resulting in colloquial or humorous spellings like pilla for pillow and winda for window.
- No cot–caught merger: The words cot /ɑ/ and caught /ɔ/ are not homophones, with the latter vowel maintaining a raised position. Likewise, the word on rhymes with dawn and not don.
- As in Philadelphia, the word water is often pronounced as wooder [ˈwʊɾɚ] or, more uniquely, warter [ˈwɔɻɾɚ].
- As in most Mid-Atlantic cities, short a is pronounced with a phonemic split: for example, the word sad /sæd/ does not rhyme with the word mad /meəd/. Pronunciation is dependent upon a complex system of rules that differ from city to city. Baltimore follows the Philadelphia pattern. For more details on the Philadelphia, New York, and Baltimore systems see /æ/ raising.

/æ/ raising in North American English
Following consonant	Example words	New York City, New Orleans	Baltimore, Philadelphia	Midland US, New England, Pittsburgh, Western US	Canada, Northern Mountain US	Minnesota, Wisconsin	Southern US	Great Lakes US
Non-prevocalic /m, n/	fan, lamb, stand	[ɛə] (Note: In New York City and Philadelphia, most function words (am, can, had, etc.) and some learned or less common words (alas, carafe, lad, etc.) have [æ].) (Note: In Philadelphia, the irregular verbs began, ran, and swam have [æ].)		[ɛə]	[ɛə]		[ɛə~ɛjə]	[ɛə]
Prevocalic /m, n/	animal, planet, Spanish	[æ]		[ɛə]	[ɛə]		[ɛə~ɛjə]	[ɛə]
/ŋ/	frank, language	[æ]		[ɛː~eɪ~æ]	[ɛː~ɛj]	[eː~ej]	[æ~æɛə]	[ɛə]
Prevocalic /ɡ/	dragon, magazine	[æ]		[æ] (Note: The untensed /æ/ may be lowered and retracted as much as [ä] in varieties affected by the Low-Back-Merger Shift, mainly predominant in Canada and the American West.)	[ɛː~ɛj]	[eː~ej]	[æ~æɛə]	[ɛə]
Non-prevocalic /ɡ/	bag, drag	[ɛə]	[æ] (Note: In Philadelphia, bad, mad, and glad alone in this context have [ɛə].)	[æ]	[ɛː~ɛj]	[eː~ej]	[æ~æɛə]	[ɛə]
Non-prevocalic /b, d, ʃ/	grab, flash, sad	[ɛə]	[æ]	[æ]	[æ]	[ɛə]	[æ~æɛə]	[ɛə]
Non-prevocalic /f, θ, s/	ask, bath, half, glass	[ɛə]		[æ]	[æ]	[ɛə]	[æ~æɛə]	[ɛə]
Otherwise	as, back, happy, locality	[æ] (Note: In New York City, certain lexical exceptions exist (like avenue being tense) and variability is common before /dʒ/ and /z/ as in imagine, magic, and jazz. In New Orleans, [ɛə] additionally occurs before /v/ and /z/.)		[æ]	[æ]	[ɛə]	[æ~æɛə]	[ɛə]

- The /ɑr/ vowel in words like start is often raised and backed, resulting in a vowel close to /ɔ/. Likewise, /ɔr/ as in bore can shift as high as /ʊr/ as in boor. This pattern has also been noted to occur in Philadelphia and New York.
- Canadian raising occurs for /aɪ/ before voiceless consonants, as in Philadelphia; for instance, the word like [ɫʌɪk] begins with a higher nucleus than live [ɫaɪv].
- On the other hand, /aɪ/ may undergo smoothing before liquids, becoming [ɑ] before /r/ and /l/; e.g., fire is pronounced as [fɑɻ], in which a popular Baltimore Christmas joke: "Why were the Three Wise Men covered with soot?" "Because they came from afar."
- [ə] is often eliminated entirely from a word when before a consonant; e.g. Annapolis = Naplis, cigarette = cigrette, company = compny, Italy = Itly.

=== Consonants ===
- Th–stopping occurs, where the dental fricatives /θ, ð/ may be realized as stops (/t, d/ respectively); for instance, this may sound more like diss.
- L–vocalization is common at the end of a word. The sound /l/ is often replaced by the semivowel or glide [w] and/or [o] or [ʊ]. Pronunciation of words like middle and college become [ˈmɪdo] and [ˈkɑwɪdʒ] respectively.
- Epenthetic /r/ often occurs; notably, wash is pronounced as [wɑɻʃ], popularly written as warsh, and Washington is pronounced as Warshington.
- As is common in many US dialects, /t/ is frequently elided after /n/, thus hunter is pronounced [ˈhʌnɚ].

== Lexicon ==
The following is a list of words and phrases used in the Baltimore area that are used much less or differently in other American English dialects.

- down the ocean – (eye-dialect spellings include dayown the ocean or downy ocean) "down to/on/at the ocean", often Ocean City, Maryland.
- hon – a popular term of endearment, short for honey, often used at the end of a sentence. This word has been a popular marker of Baltimore culture, as represented in the annual Honfest summer festival and in landmarks such as the Hontown store and the Café Hon restaurant.
- natty boh – local slang for the beer originally brewed in Baltimore, National Bohemian.
- pavement (commonly pronounced "payment") – means "sidewalk."
- went up (shortened from "went up to heaven") – commonly used when an appliance dies; e.g., our refrigerator went up
- yo – as a gender-neutral third-person singular pronoun

African-American Baltimore English includes the words ard for "alright", lor for "little", rey for ready (associated with Baltimore users of Black Twitter), and woe for a close friend.

== African-American variations ==
According to linguists, the "hon" dialect that is popularized in the media and that derives historically from the speech of white blue-collar residents of South and Southeast Baltimore is not the only accent spoken in the region. There is also a particular Baltimore accent found among Black Baltimoreans: a sub-type of African-American Vernacular English.

For example, among Black speakers, Baltimore is pronounced more like "Baldamore" /ˌbɔldəˈmɔr/, as compared to "Bawlmer" /ˈbɔlmər/. Other notable phonological characteristics include vowel centralization before /r/ (such that words such as "carry" and "parents" are often pronounced as "curry" or "purrents", and "Aaron earned an iron urn" might sound like "Urrun urned an arn urn," an example popularized in a viral video) and the mid-centralization of /ɑ/, particularly in the word "dog," often pronounced like "dug," and "frog" as "frug." The African-American Baltimore accent, or a variation thereof, is also shared by many African Americans throughout Maryland and the Washington metropolitan area.

== Notable native speakers ==
=== Lifelong speakers ===
- Judy Agnew – U.S. Second Lady
- Spiro Agnew – U.S. Vice President
- Ben Cardin – Maryland U.S. Senator (2007–2025)
- Mary Pat Clarke – Baltimore City Councilwoman (1975–2020)
- Divine – actor
- Charley Eckman – NBA coach and referee, sportscaster
- Stavros Halkias – stand-up comedian
- Mel Kiper Jr. – football analyst for ESPN
- Barbara Mikulski – Maryland U.S. Senator (1987–2017)
- Felicia Pearson – actress on The Wire
- Nancy Pelosi – former Speaker of the United States House of Representatives
- Babe Ruth – Baseball Hall of Famer
- Chip Silverman – author and lacrosse coach
- John Waters – filmmaker

== In popular culture ==
=== Films ===
The films of John Waters, many of which have been filmed in and around Baltimore, often attempt to capture the Baltimore accent, particularly the early films. For example, John Waters uses his own Baltimore accent in the commentary during his film Pink Flamingos. John Travolta's character in the 2007 version of John Waters's Hairspray spoke with an exaggerated Baltimore accent. Likewise, several of the films of Barry Levinson are set in and around Baltimore during the 1940s-1960s, and employ the Baltimore accent. Michael Tucker, who was born and raised in Baltimore, speaks with a West Baltimore accent.

=== Television ===
Television drama series Homicide: Life on the Street and The Wire are both set in Baltimore and in some cases include actors who are native white and Black Baltimoreans. In the early Homicide: Life on the Street episode "Three Men and Adena", a suspect, Risley Tucker, describes how he can tell whereabouts in or around the city a person comes from simply by whether they pronounce the city's name as "Balti-maw", "Balti-moh", or "Bawl-mer".

In Season 4, Episode 7 of The Tracey Ullman Show, Baltimore actor Michael Tucker portrays the father of Ullman's character JoJo. The skit is set in a Baltimore row house. Tucker advises Ullman to "take a Liverpool accent and Americanize it." The episode called "The Stoops" begins with Tracey washing her marble stoops, which are the most common small porches attached to most Baltimore town homes (called row houses in Baltimore).

In the 30 Rock episode, "I Do Do", Elizabeth Banks parodies the accent by portraying Avery Jessup, the spokesperson for the fictional Overshoppe.com in a flashback scene.

Kathy Bates' character on the "Freak Show" season of American Horror Story was inspired by a Baltimore accent.

Whether it was on his ESPN Radio show or SportsCenter at Night, Scott Van Pelt always ended his segments with Tim Kurkjian by mentioning names in a Baltimore accent featuring at least one fronted 'o'.

=== Music ===
Singer-songwriter Mary Prankster uses several examples of Baltimore slang in her song, "Blue Skies Over Dundalk," from the album of the same name, including, "There'll be O's fans going downy ocean, hon."

=== Podcasts ===
Jason La Canfora, host of the B-More Opinionated podcast with Jerry Coleman and resident of Dundalk, regularly discussed events of the National Football League for The Tony Kornheiser Show podcast and will end the segment plugging his own podcast in a heavy Baltimore accent. The accent is so distinct that his dog, Copper, will react to it, barking constantly because he knows it is time for a walk.

Comedian Stavros Halkias (a native of Greektown) was also known for performing an exaggerated version of a Baltimore accent on the podcast Cum Town, when impersonating a typical citizen of Dundalk.

== See also ==
- Culture of Baltimore
- List of people from Baltimore
- Regional vocabularies of American English

== Bibliography ==
- Baker, Adam; Mielke, Jeff; Archangeli, Diana (2008). "More velar than /g/: Consonant Coarticulation as a Cause of Diphthongization" (PDF). In Chang, Charles B.; Haynie, Hannah J. (eds.). Proceedings of the 26th West Coast Conference on Formal Linguistics. Somerville, Massachusetts: Cascadilla Proceedings Project. pp. 60–68. ISBN 978-1-57473-423-2.
- Boberg, Charles (2008). "Regional phonetic differentiation in Standard Canadian English". Journal of English Linguistics. 36 (2): 129–154. doi:10.1177/0075424208316648. S2CID 146478485.
- Duncan, Daniel (2016). "'Tense' /æ/ is still lax: A phonotactics study" (PDF). In Hansson, Gunnar Ólafur; Farris-Trimble, Ashley; McMullin, Kevin; Pulleyblank, Douglas (eds.). Supplemental Proceedings of the 2015 Annual Meeting on Phonology. Vol. 3. Washington, D.C.: Linguistic Society of America. doi:10.3765/amp.v3i0.3653.
- Labov, William (2007). "Transmission and Diffusion" (PDF). Language. 83 (2): 344–387. doi:10.1353/lan.2007.0082. JSTOR 40070845. S2CID 6255506.
- Labov, William; Ash, Sharon; Boberg, Charles (2006). The Atlas of North American English. Berlin: Mouton de Gruyter. ISBN 978-3-11-016746-7.
