= Osiris (disambiguation) =

Osiris is an Egyptian deity.

Osiris may also refer to:

== Astronomy ==
- 1923 Osiris, an asteroid
- Osiris (lunar crater)
- Osiris (planet) or HD 209458 b, an extrasolar planet
- Osiris (Ganymede crater), a crater on Ganymede
- OSIRIS-REx, later OSIRIS-APEX, space missions to return asteroid samples
- Odin-OSIRIS, an atmospheric measurement instrument
- OH-Suppressing Infrared Integral Field Spectrograph
- Optical System for Imaging and low Resolution Integrated Spectroscopy
- Optical, Spectroscopic, and Infrared Remote Imaging System

== Entertainment ==
- Osiris (DC Comics), any of three characters from DC Comics
- Osiris (funk band), 1970s funk band led by Tyrone Brunson
- Osiris (Marvel Comics), a fictional character in the Marvel Comics universe
- Osiris (Stargate), a character in Stargate SG-1
- Osiris (symphony), a symphony by Gamal Abdel-Rahim
- Osiris: New Dawn, an action-adventure video game
- Born of Osiris, American heavy metal musical ensemble
- Osiris (film), a 2025 action-scifi film

== People ==
- Daniel Iffla, French financier and philanthropist also known as Osiris
- Osiris Matos (born 1984), Dominican professional baseball player
- Osiris Rodríguez Castillos (1925-1996), Uruguayan writer, poet, composer, and singer
- Osiris Valdés López (born 1989), Cuban-Spanish author and artist
- Tiago Emanuel da Silva Miranda (born 1989), Portuguese singer-songwriter also known as Conan Osíris
- YK Osiris (Osiris Jahkail Williams), American rapper and singer

== Other ==
- Osiris (bee), a genus of cleptoparasitic bees
- Osiris (journal), on the history of science
- Osiris (software)
- Osiris, Missouri, a US community
- Osiris Shoes, a skateboarding footwear company
- Osiris, a South Devon Railway Comet class steam locomotive
- HMS Osiris, a UK submarine
- Optical Space Infrared Downlink System, German satellite experiments
- Osiris (reactor), a nuclear reactor operated by CEA Saclay

== See also ==
- Osyris, a genus of plants
- Osirak, an Iraqi nuclear reactor based on the French-designed Osiris reactor
