= List of works by Antonin Mercié =

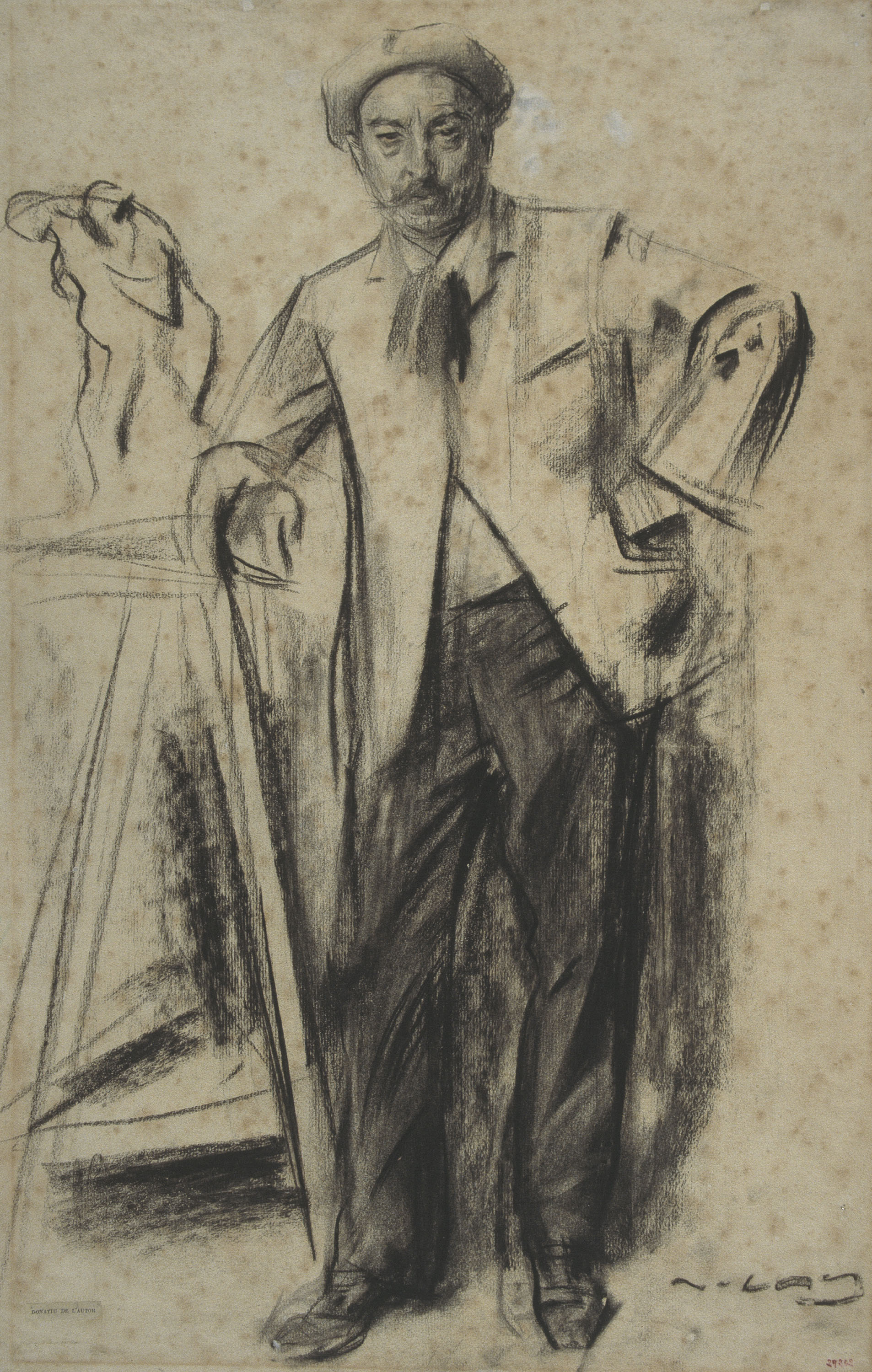
A portrait of Antonin Mercié by Ramon Casas conserved at MNAC in Barcelona

This is a list of some of the works of the French sculptor and painter Antonin Mercié.

== Biography ==
Marius Jean Antonin Mercié was born in Toulouse and attended the École des Beaux-Arts in Paris where he studied under François Jouffroy and Alexandre Falguière. In 1868, he won the Prix de Rome with the composition Thésée vainqueur du Minotaure.

In 1872, and whilst working in Rome, courtesy of the Prix de Rome, he submitted the work entitled David vainqueur du Goliath to the Paris Salon and this won him the Salon's "medaiile de première classe". By 1874 Mercié's fame was growing and in that year he submitted the work Gloria Victis (Gloire aux Vaincus) to the Salon and this enjoyed great success. In this composition Mercié marked the defeat of 1870 but glorified the patriotism and heroism of the French soldiers. Gloria Victis has been used on many monuments.

Antonin Mercié was to produce a number of works with the theme of patriotism. The enigmatic Quand meme! used on the Belfort memorial and the work Jeanne d'Arc relevant l'épée de 1a France were two such works.

From 1880 onwards he practiced also as a painter and was made Professor of design and sculpture at the École des Beaux Arts where he was to inspire many artists including Constantin Brâncuși. In 1891 he entered the Institut français and in 1913 was made President of the Société des artistes français.

Mercié is regarded as having been a member of the group known as the "École toulousaine" along with Laurent Marqueste (1848–1920), Victor Segoffin (1867–1925), Jean-Marie Mengue (1855–1949) and Auguste Seysses (1862–1946). Alexandre Falguière was regarded as the group's leader.

== List of principal works ==
Name	Location	Photograph	Notes
Thésée vainqueur du Minotaure, remercie les Dieux	École nationale supérieure des Beaux-Arts		It was with this composition that Mercie won the Prix de Rome in 1868. As already stated winning this prestigious price meant that Mercié was able to spend time studying in Rome with his expenses paid as part of the prize.
Statue of David	Musée d'Orsay		The Musée d'Orsay hold a bronze casting of Mercié's David by the founders Thiebaut frères. It was whilst in Rome (at the Villa Médicis) that Mercié had executed the model of David in plaster. It was subsequently submitted to the Paris Salon in 1872 and was awarded a "médaille de 1ère classe". Larger plaster versions are in the museums of Cusset, Dijon and Toulouse and at the Villa Médicis itself. A marble version was exhibited at the Paris Éxposition Universelle of 1889 and the Barbedienne foundry produced limited editions in six different sizes. In the gallery below are photographs of the version of Mercié's David held by the University of Copenhagen.
Monument to the dead of the 1870–71 war. Gloria Victis	Châlons-en-Champagne	Sculpture Gloria Victis, designed by Antonin Mercié. Placed at the roundabout between Boulevard Victor Hugo and Boulevard Aristide Briand in Châlons-en-Champagne in 1890. A gift by Don de Joseph Chevalier. In his composition Gloria Victis, Mercié puts forward the patriotic proposition that France had demonstrated honour and achieved glory even in the defeat of 1870.	This monument is located in the place de la Libération in Châlons-en-Champagne. It is a copy of the composition which originally stood in one of the interior courtyards of Paris' Hôtel de Ville and was acquired for Châlons-en-Champagne by Don de Joseph Chevalier, a local philanthropist. From 1892 to 1921, the monument stood in the square Carnot in Châlons-en-Champagne but was moved to its present location when replaced by the 1914–18 war memorial. The Gloria Victis monument comprises a limestone column supporting Mercié's sculpture which depicts an "Angel of Victory" who supports a mortally injured soldier. Symbolically the soldier's sword is broken. The simple inscription reads "Gloria Victis" which translates to "Glory to the vanquished". Even in defeat there is honour and glory! This work has been produced in a variety of limited editions and the photograph above is of a copy held by the National Gallery of Art in Washington.
Statue of Robert E. Lee	Richmond, Virginia		See photograph in gallery below.
Statue of Adolphe Thiers	Saint-Germain-en-Laye		Thiers was a frequent visitor to Saint-Germain-en-Laye for health reasons, staying at the Pavillon Henri IV hotel and he died there when on a visit in 1877. A statue of Thiers was erected in 1880 but was destroyed during the German occupation in 1941.
Statue of William Tell	Lausanne		The Musée d'Orsay hold Mercié's plaster model of William Tell which was shown at the Paris Salon in 1892 with a version in marble being shown at the Salon in 1895, before being erected in Lausanne. From 1912 until 1982 the plaster model was held by the Musée national du château de Malmaison. It was due to the generosity of the philanthropist Daniel Osiris that the marble version of William Tell was given to the city of Lausanne. Osiris was a French philanthropist and art patron, born in Bordeaux in 1825. He had acquired the William Tell marble from the Salon and gave the work to Lausanne along with the inscription "A la Suisse, en reconnaissance de l'hospitalité donnée à l'armée française 1870" This translates as "To Switzerland in recognition of the hospitality given to the French army in 1870". Osiris had also given Mercie's statue of Alfred de Musset to the city of Paris and many other French cities and institutions were to benefit from Osiris' generosity.
Statue of Alfred de Musset	Parc Monceau		The Alfred de Musset monument, now in the Parc Monceau, was financed by the great philanthropist Daniel Osiris who commissioned Alexandre Falguière and Antonin Mercié to work on the project. The idea was to show de Musset seated and being inspired by a muse. Falguière was asked to complete the sculpture of the muse whilst Mercié was to work on the figure of de Musset himself but after delays in getting the project moving, Falguière's death in 1900 meant that Mercié had to complete the whole sculpture himself. The idea of the composition came from de Musset's poems which included "La nuit de Mai" and were constructed around an imaginary dialogue between the poet and the "Muse of Poetry". The statue was inaugurated on the 23 February 1906. Originally it was placed near the Comédie française but moved to the Parc Monceau in 1981. The composition is in marble. There is a second monument to Alfred de Musset in Paris. It is called "Le rêve du poète" and is the work of Alphonse de Moncel. It is located near the Grand Palais in the place du Canada.
Monument to Ernest Meissonier		Mercié's statue of Ernest Meissonier	Mercié executed the sculptural work for the monument to the French painter Ernest Meissonier in Poissy. In Mercié's composition Meissonier sits holding his head in his right hand, the same pose as in his famous self-portrait. On the pedestal the names of Meissonier's best known paintings are listed. On the right side - La rixe/Les joueurs de boules/le Chant/la Madone des Baccio/le portrait du sergent and on the left side La barricade 1848/Solférino/les Tuileries/le Guide/Siège de Paris, 1870-1871. On the reverse side of the pedestal are listed Iéna 1806/les cuirassiers/Campagne de France 1814/ le Général Desaix Friedland 1807. Mercié carried out the work involved in 1895, guided after the painter's death by a committee led by the Duc d'Aumale. The inauguration took place on 26 October 1895, the ceremony led by Raymond Poincaré. The monument was moved to a public garden in Poissy in 1980.
Monument to Victor Massé			The composer Victor Massé was born in Lorient on 9 September 1822. He won the "Prix de Rome" in 1844 for his work in music. Mercié executed a statue of Victor Massé in white marble which stood in Lorient but sadly this was destroyed during a bombing raid in February 1943. In the link here we can see an old postcard of the monument. Victor Massé's best known pieces are "Noces de Jeannette", "Galathée" and "Paul et Virginie".
Figure with US Flag at the top of the Francis Scott Key Monument	Baltimore	Francis Scott Key monument in Baltimore	Mercié executed the figure carrying a flag at the top of the Francis Scott Key monument in Baltimore.
Statue of Louis Vestrepain	Toulouse		Mercié was the sculptor of the study of Louis Vestrepain in the Jardin du Grand Rond in Toulouse. In this public garden there is also a copy of "David terrassant Goliath" by Mercié.
Statue of Mireille	Saintes-Maries-de-la-Mer		Mireille or Mireio was the subject of Frédéric Mistral's best known poem and it was at Saintes-Maries-de-la-Mer that she met her tragic death. Mistral always wanted to offer a statue of Mireille to the town but died before this could be arranged. However, his widow, conscious of Mistral's wish, organized for the sculpture to be given to the town and on the 26 September 1920 it was erected in the Place Frédéric Mistral which was then renamed the Place Mireille. The statue was inaugurated in a ceremony attended by Mistral's nephew. The statue stood undisturbed until the German occupation during the Second World War when it became known that it was intended to remove the work and have the bronze melted down. This was not uncommon, such action being taken by the Germans themselves or in conjunction with the authorities in Vichy. A man by the name of Julien Durand was however to rescue the statue from this fate. The family Durand had been regular visitors to Sainte Maries as pilgrims and as a boy Julien became aware of the traditions and culture of the Camargue. When Durand grew up he worked in the metal trade and was sometimes involved in the transportation of metal requisitioned by the Germans. In 1943 he was sent to Saintes-Maries on such a mission and was horrified to discover that the pieces to be transported included the bronze of Mireille. The statue was dismantled, loaded on a truck and moved to Nîmes where it was to be weighed before bring melted down. Julien Durand resolved to stop this happening. He hid the statue of Mireille and managed to use substitute materials to disguise the absence of Mireille when the weighing took place. He was successful and the substitute material (some copper)was melted down instead of Mireille! When the war was over the people of Saintes-Maries, perhaps reconciled to the loss of their statue, were astonished when Durand arrived and brought Mireille back to them!
Medallion depicting the sculptor Peter Victor	Musée d'Orsay		This bronze medallion by Mercié dates to 1885. It was made in the Sèvres factory and then moved to the Musée du Luxembourg then the Musée national d'Art moderne before being moved to the Musée d'Orsay in 1977.
War memorial in Belfort	Belfort	Belfort war memorial	This monument, with sculpture by Mercié, commemorates those who gave their lives in the 1870–71 war. It is located in Belfort 's place d'Armes. The memorial is known as the "Quand-même" words which encapsulate the hope that Alsace would return to France. Apart from the intention of remembering and honouring those who gave their lives in the Franco-Prussian war, the monument was also intended to celebrate Belfort remaining part of France and to honour Thiers and Colonel Pierre Marie Aristide Denfert-Rochereau. It was decided to use a composition which Mercié had shown at the Paris Salon in 1882 and had entitled "Quand-Même", as the monument's centre-piece. Political rivalries in evidence at the time, the roles of Thiers and Denfert- Rochereau being a source of contention with some, caused the final erection of the monument to be delayed until July 1884 and the inauguration ceremony took place on the 31 August 1884. Until 1871, Belfort was part of the département of Haut-Rhin, in Alsace. The Siege of Belfort, between 3 November 1870 and 18 February 1871, was successfully resisted until the garrison was ordered to surrender 21 days after the armistice between France and Prussia. Because this part of Alsace was French-speaking, while the rest of Alsace was German-speaking, the area around Belfort was not annexed by the Prussians and it formed, as it still does, the Territoire de Belfort. The siege is commemorated by a huge statue, the Lion of Belfort, by Frédéric Bartholdi and the erection of "Quand-Même" caused some controversy between the protagonists of these two different monuments. The composition "Quand même" was also used on a medal struck for the far right Ligue des Patriotes.
The tomb of Raymond Adolphe Séré de Rivières			Mercie executed a medallion for the tomb of Raymond Séré de Rivières. The tomb bears the inscription "Lapides clamabunt" ("the stones will testify"). Raymond Adolphe Séré de Rivières was a French military engineer and general whose ideas revolutionized the design of fortifications in France. He gave his name to the Séré de Rivières system of fortifications constructed after the Franco-Prussian War of 1870.
Tomb of Paul-Jacques-Aimé Baudry		The tomb of Paul Baudry	Mercié worked on Baudry's tomb in the Père-Lachaise cemetery in Paris. The tomb was designed by Ambroise Baudry, Paul's brother. The bust on the tomb is by Paul Dubois and Mercié was responsible for the two bronze compositions "la Douleur" and another woman who is placing a crown of laurels on Baudry's bust. "La Douleur" was cast by E. Bardedienne. The inscription reads "PAVLO. BAVDRY. PICTORI/PAVLVS. DVBOIS. /AMICVS. AMICO. FECIT/. PARISIORVM.ANNO. MDCCCLXXXII" [18]
Statue of François Arago			This statue by Mercié is located in Perpignan. Arago was a French mathematician and physicist.
The work "Souvenir"	Musée d'Orsay		This Mercié composition is held in the Musée d'Orsay. See photograph in gallery below. The composition was used by Mercié on the tomb of Charles Ferry. It was shown at the Paris Salon in 1885. There are two marble copies in circulation, the one in the Musée d'Orsay and another in the Ny Carlsberg Glyptotek in Copenhagen.
The tomb of Jules Michelet		Tomb of Jules Michelet. Mercié's allegory of "History" steps over Michelet's corpse	Mercié created a bas-relief depicting the body of the French historian and an allegory of "history" in the form of a woman. Upon his death from a heart attack at Hyères on February 9, 1874. Jules Michelet was interred there. At his widow's request, a Paris court granted permission for his body to be exhumed on May 13, 1876. On May 16, his coffin arrived for reburial at Le Père Lachaise Cemetery in Paris. Michelet's monument there, designed by architect Jean-Louis Pascal, was erected in 1893 through public subscription.
Statue of General de Faidherbe in Lille			Mercié executed this equestrian statue of Louis Faidherbe who made great efforts to repel the Prussian invaders in 1870. On the pedestal are several reliefs which recount some events from the life of de Faidherbe known as the "Victor of Bapaume". See photograph in gallery below.
"Jeanne d'Arc relevant l'épée de la France"			This work by Mercie was commissioned in 1890 by the General Council of the Vosges. It was shown at the Paris Salon of 1893 and erected in Domrémy-la-Pucelle in 1902.
Palais du Trocadéro			The "ancien palais du Trocadéro"" was built for the Expositon universelle of 1878. It was dismantled in 1935 for the "Éxposition spécialisée de 1937" and then replaced by the palais de Chaillot.
Statue of William II of the Netherlands			Another fine equestrian statue by Mercié, assisted by Victor Peter. The king is shown riding his horse Wexy. Apart from the statue in the Hague there is also a copy of the work in Luxembourg. See photograph in gallery below.
Statue of Alexandru Lahovary			Mercié was commissioned to carry out the sculptural work on this statue in Bucharest. See photograph in gallery below.
Tomb of Constantin Lahovary		Tomb of Lahovary. A naked man holds a funeral urn and looks down pensively at the tomb below. The figure is an allegory for grief and is entitled Douleur	In Mercié's composition a naked man crouches whilst holding a funeral urn. The work is an allegory for "Douleur" or grief. The inscription reads "Constantin N. Lahovary/Bucharest Roumanie 1848"/Paris 21 janvier 1911"
The Genius of Arts			This work by Mercié is on the façade of the Louvre and facing the Seine. See image in gallery below.
The tomb of Louis Laussedat			Laussedat is buried in the cemetery in Moulins, Allier. Mercie executed a bronze bust for the tomb.
The tomb of Henri d'Orléans			Mercié was commissioned to sculpt the effigy on the tomb of Henri d'Orléans in the Chapelle royale Saint-Louis de Dreux.
Effigies of François of Orléans, prince of Joinville and of Ferdinand d'Orléans, the Duke of Alençon			Also in the Chapelle royale Saint-Louis de Dreux are the tombs of François of Orléans, Prince of Joinville and of Ferdinand d'Orléans, the Duke of Alençon and Mercié executed the effigies. See photograph in gallery below.
Statues of Louis-Philippe of France and Maria Amalia		Statues of Louis-Philippe of France and Maria Amalia	This work by Mercié is also in the Chapelle royale Saint-Louis de Dreux
=The tomb of Adolphe Thiers			The Thiers mausoleum involves sculpture by Mercié and Henri Chapu. Chapu's work involved a relief carved over the mausoleum's door entitled Patriotism whilst Mercié's sculpture is an allegory representing "l'Immortalité" and is in the tomb's interior. The tomb bears the inscription PATRIAM DILEXIT VERITATEM COLUIT
The tomb of Léon Laurent-Pichat			For this tomb a medallion depicting Laurent-Pichat was used. See photograph in gallery.
Works held in the Musée des Augustins			In this Toulouse museum one can see several Mercie works. These include:-: A bronze version of David vainqueur de Goliath dating to 1870.; Quand même. A bronze version dating to 1874.; L'Eté. Marble work dating to 1889.

== Gallery ==
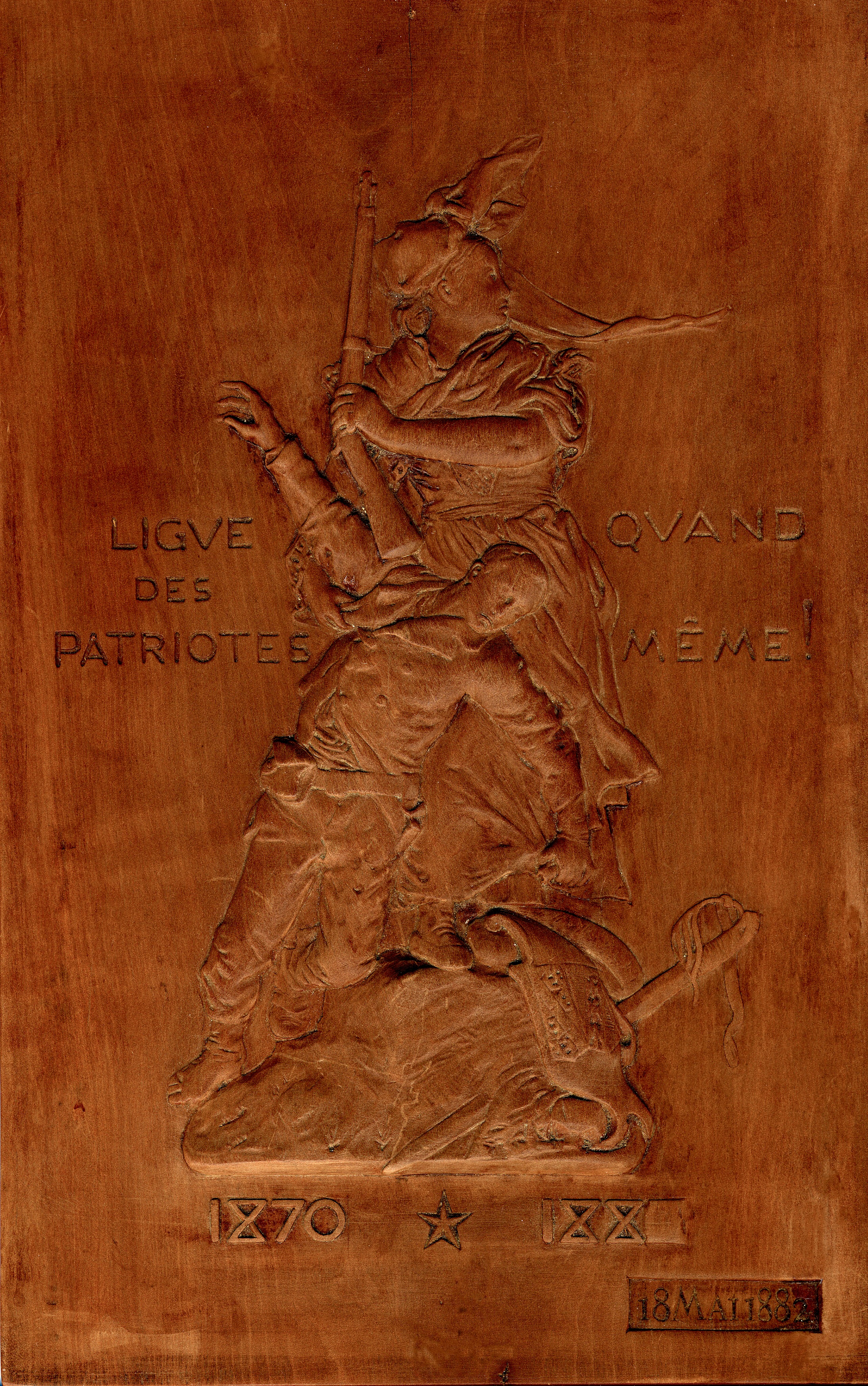
Medal struck for the Ligue des Patriotes and featuring the composition "Quand même".

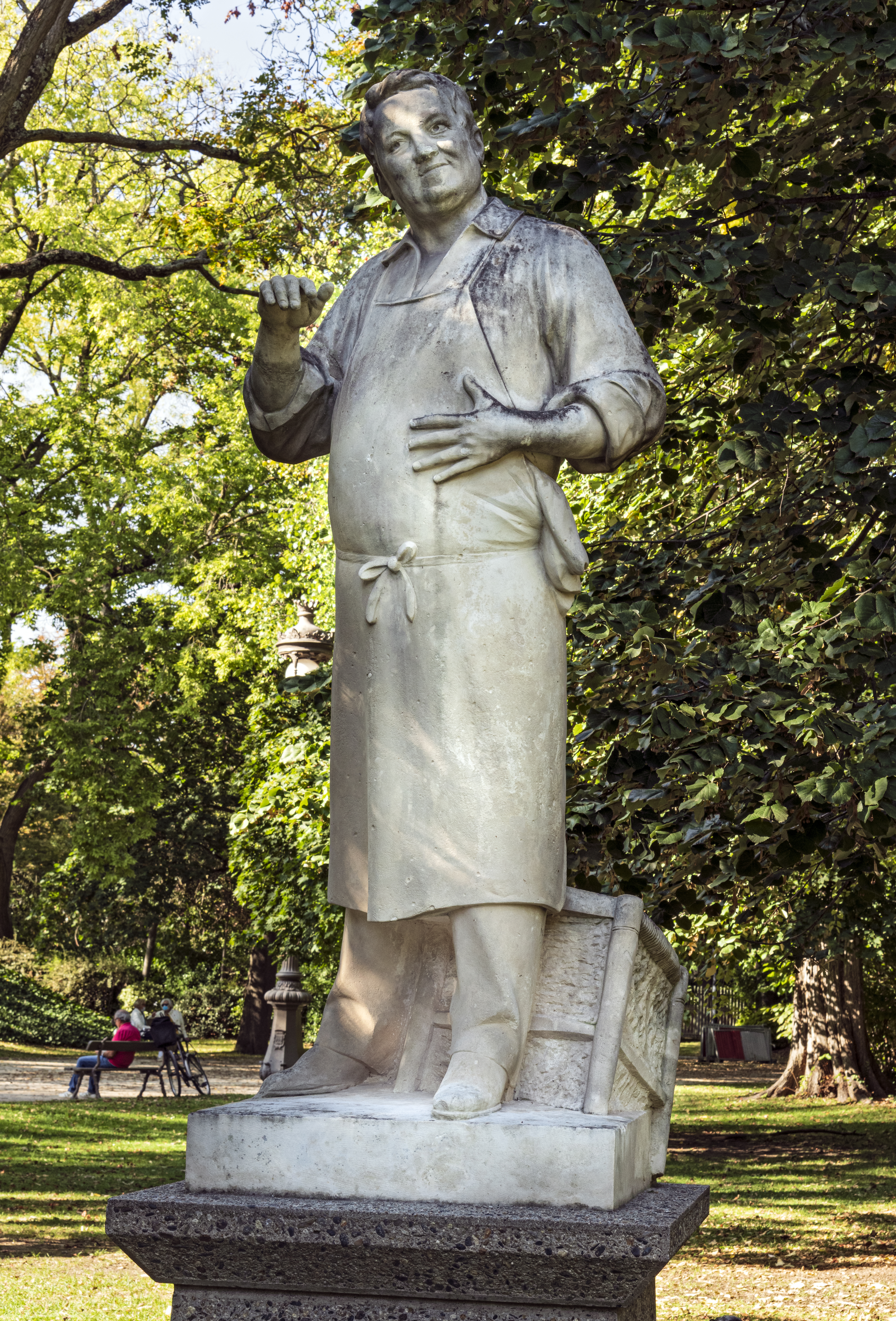
Statue of Louis Vestrepain in the Grand Rond, Toulouse.

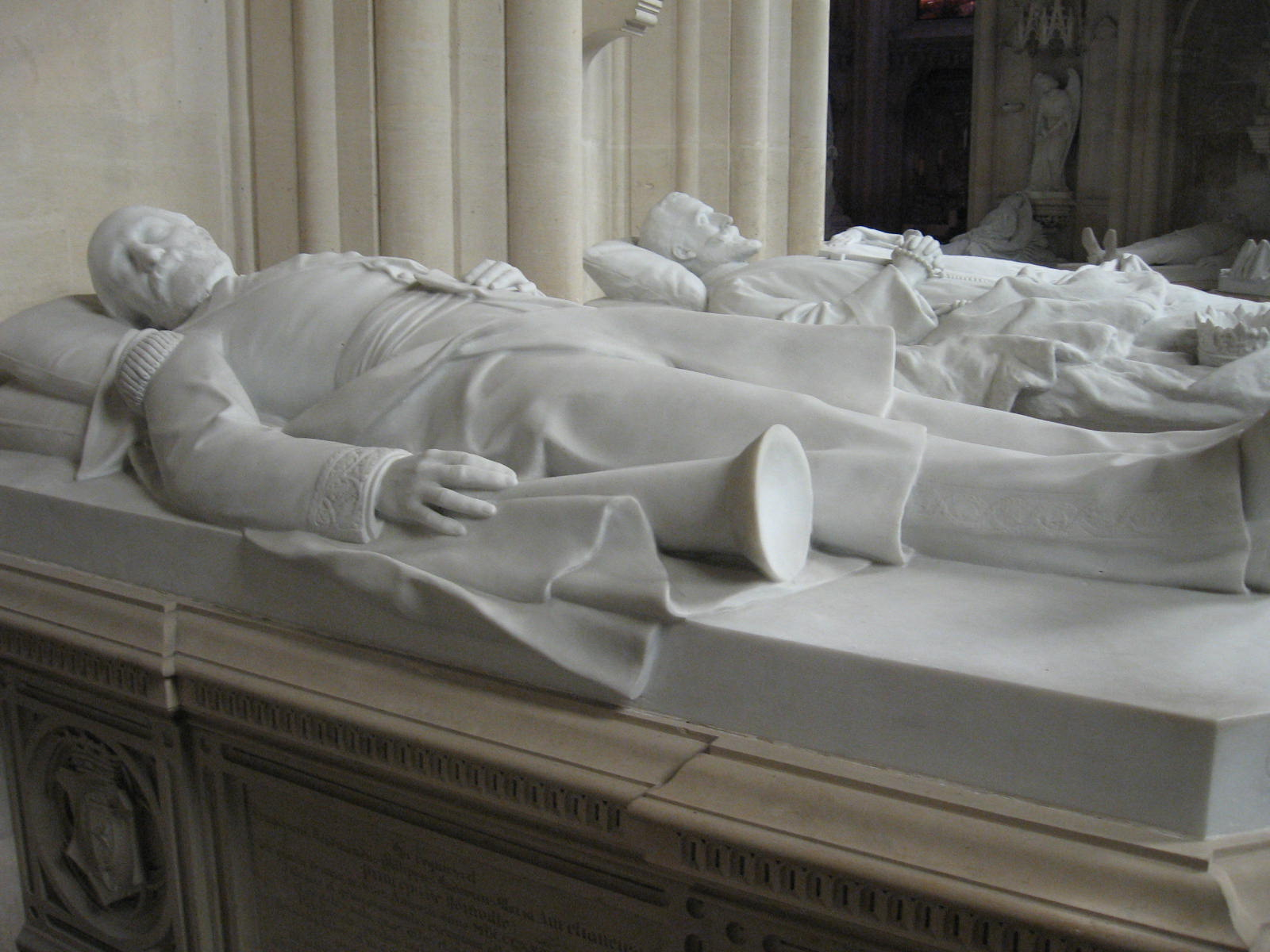
Effigies of François d'Orléans, Prince of Joinville and Ferdinand d'Orléans, Duke of Alençon.

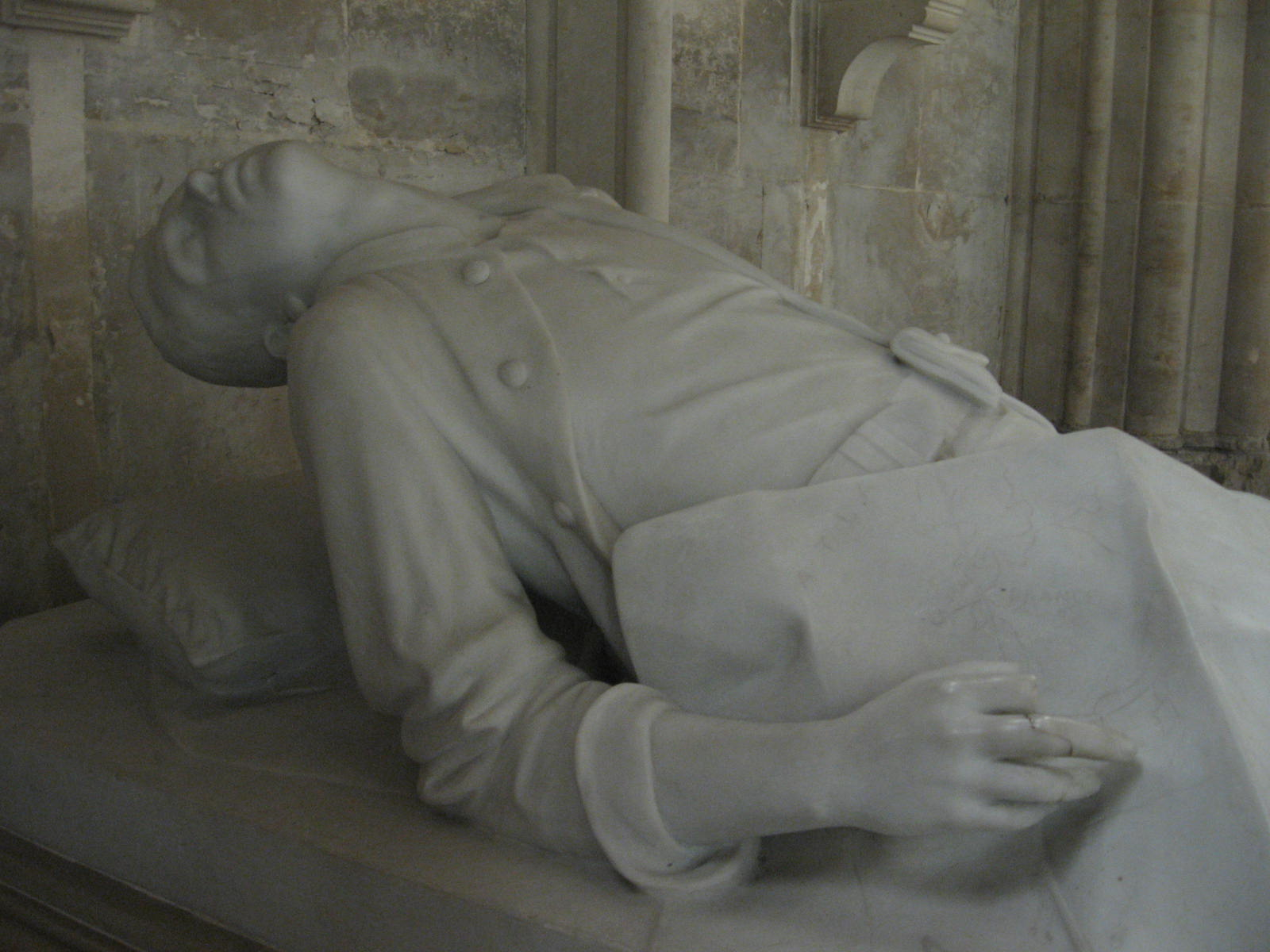
Effigy of Henri d'Orléans in Chapelle royale Saint-Louis de Dreux.

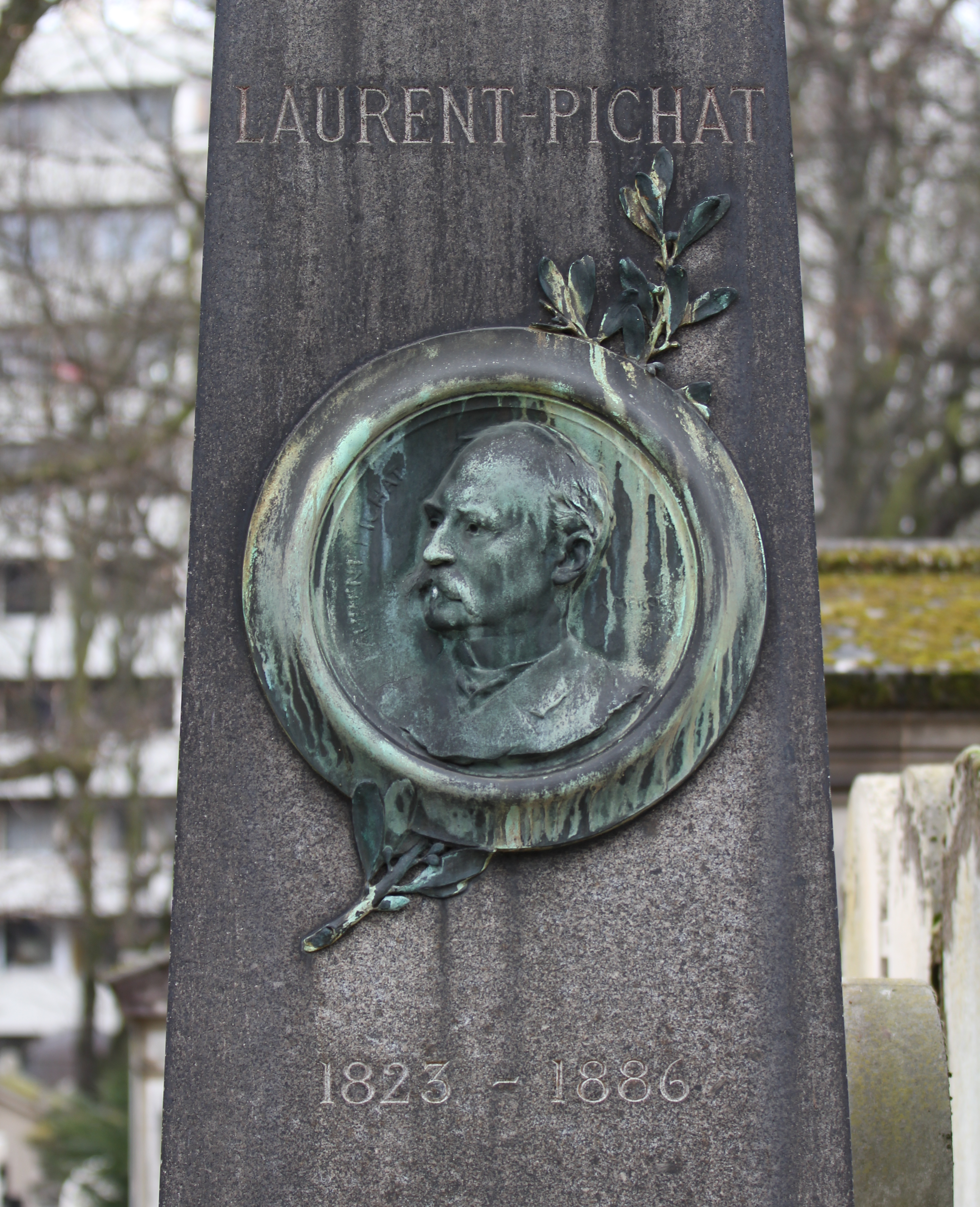
Medallion by Mercié on the tomb of Laurent-Pichat

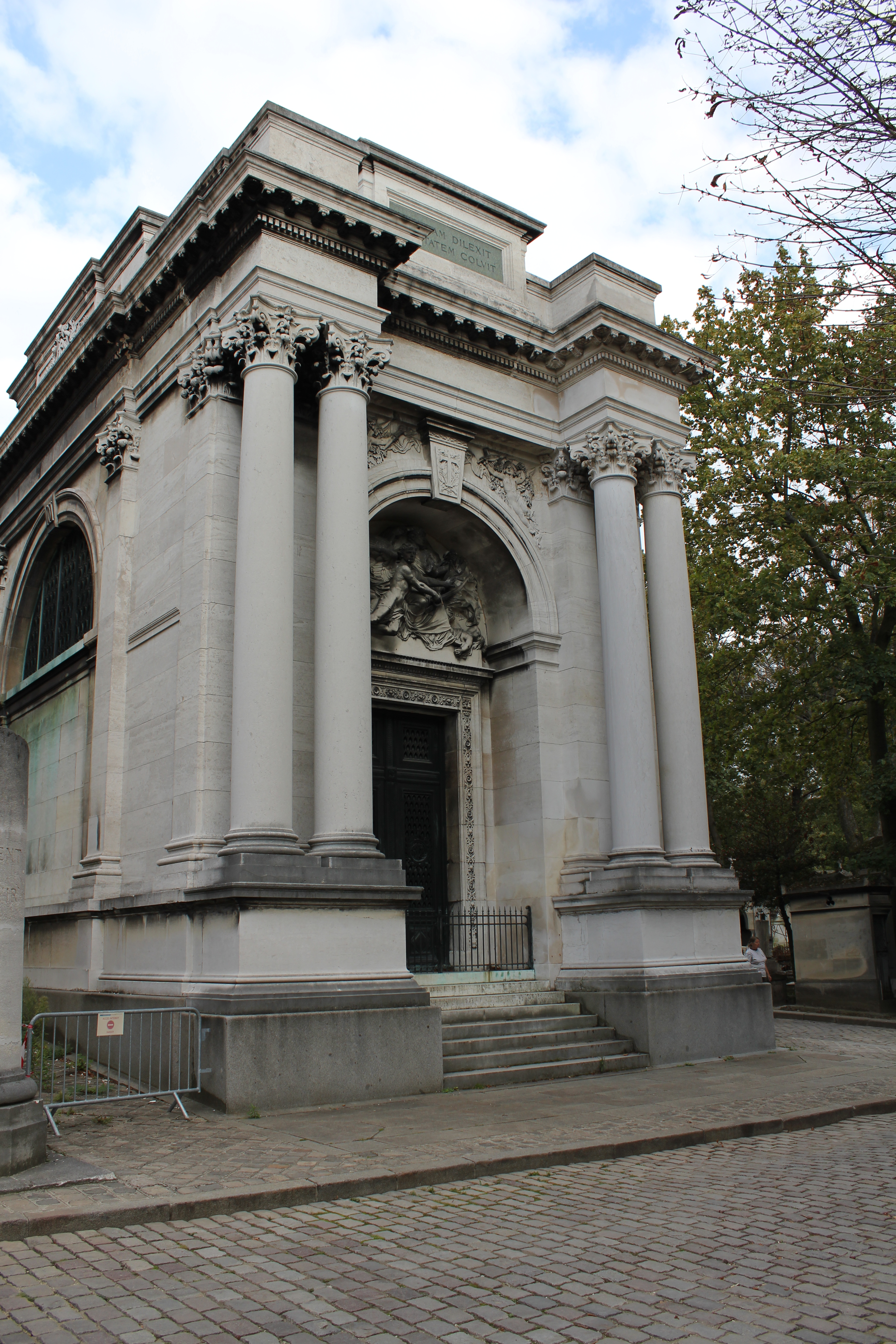
Adolphe Thiers' mausoleum. Chapu's relief can be seen over the door. Mercié's sculpture is inside the mausoleum.

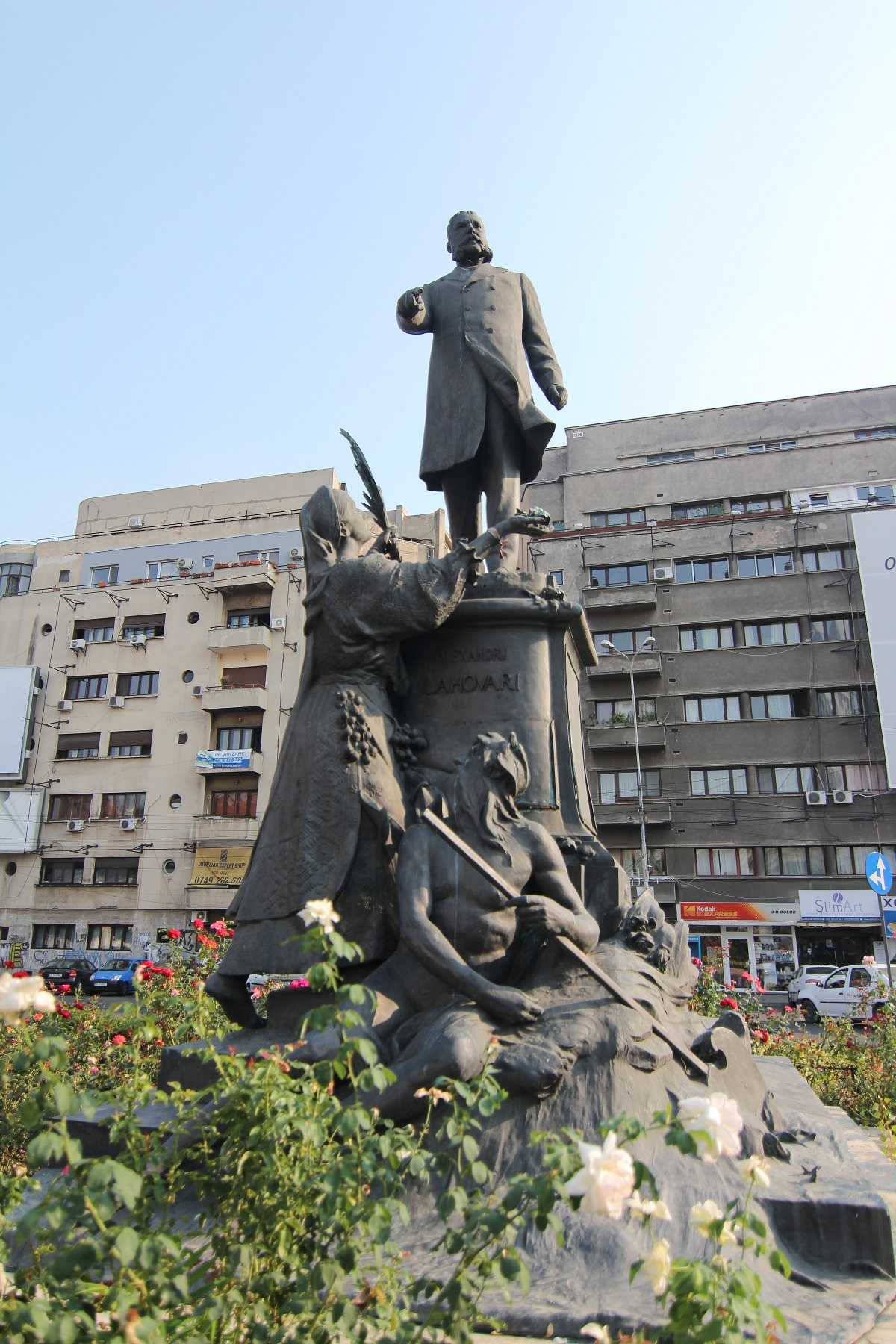
Statue to Alexandru Lahovary in Bucharest

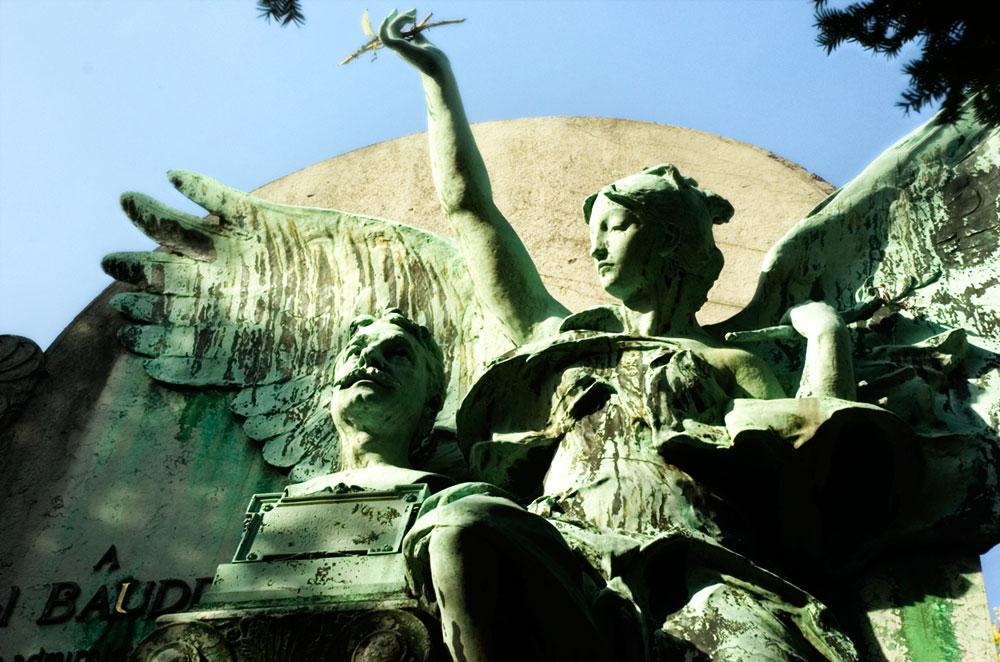
Part of composition on tomb of Paul Baudry. A winged angel is about to place a crown of laurels on Baudry's head.

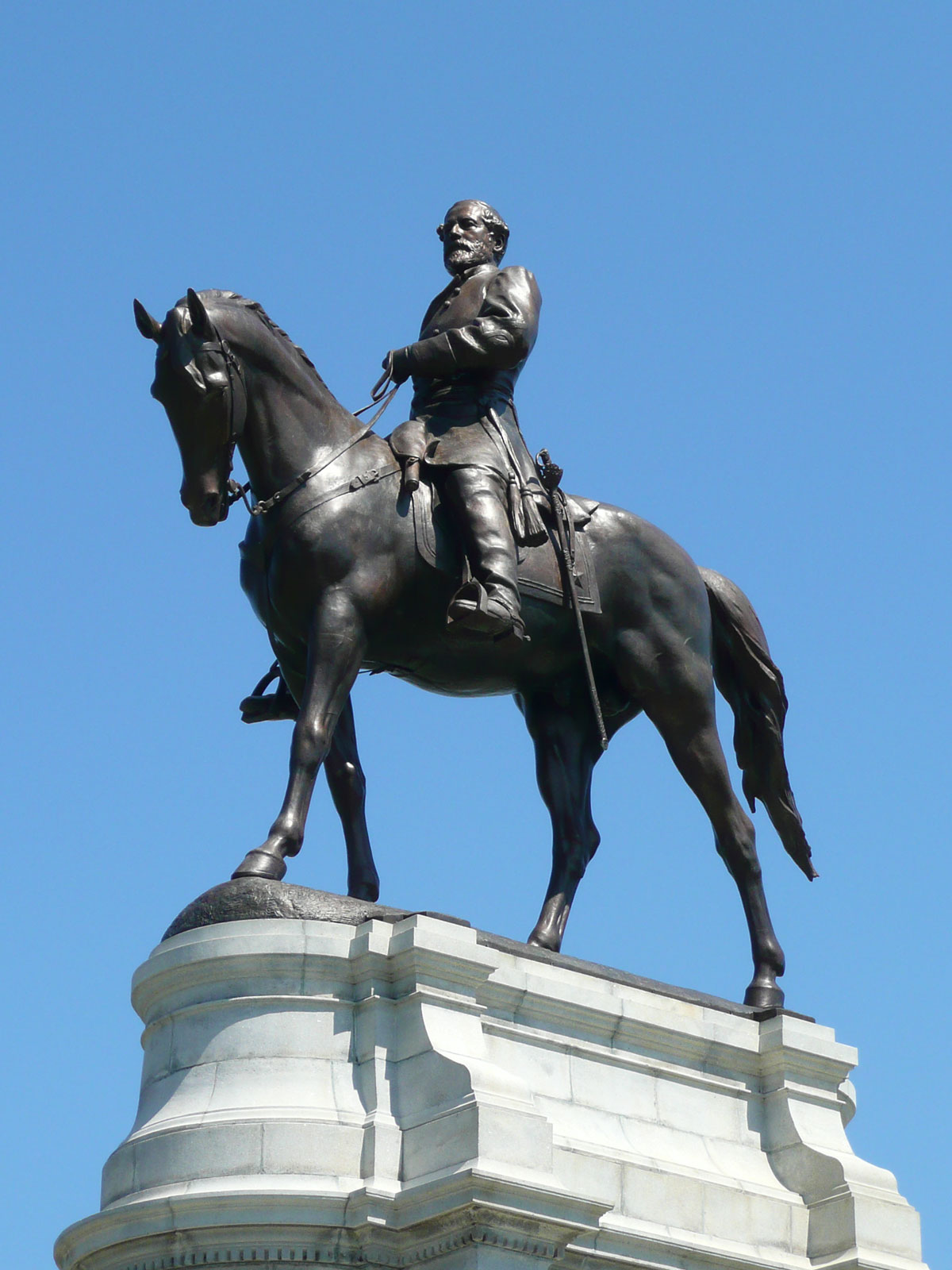
Photograph of the statue of Robert E. Lee in Monument Ave., Richmond, Virginia

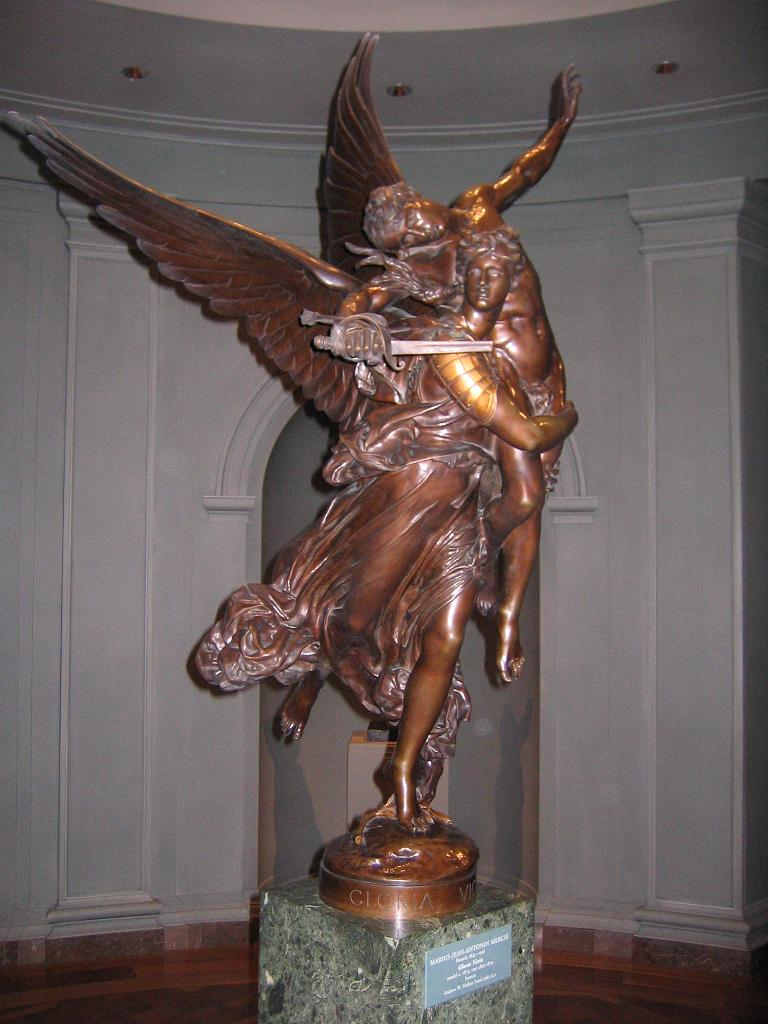
Gloria Victis- Glory to the vanquished. The version shown here exhibited at the National Gallery of Art in Washington, DC, US.

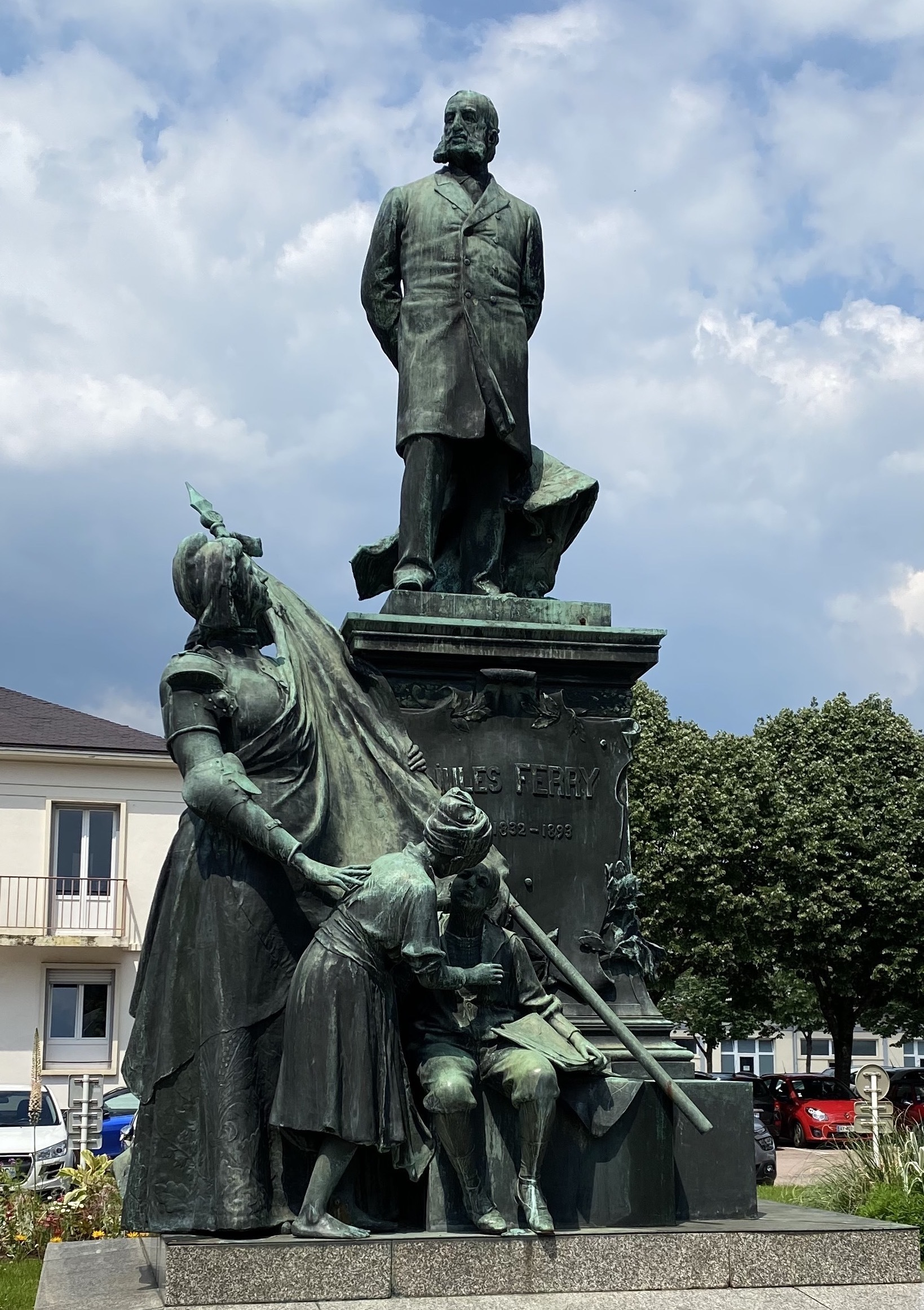
Statue of Jules Ferry in Saint-Dié-des-Vosges.

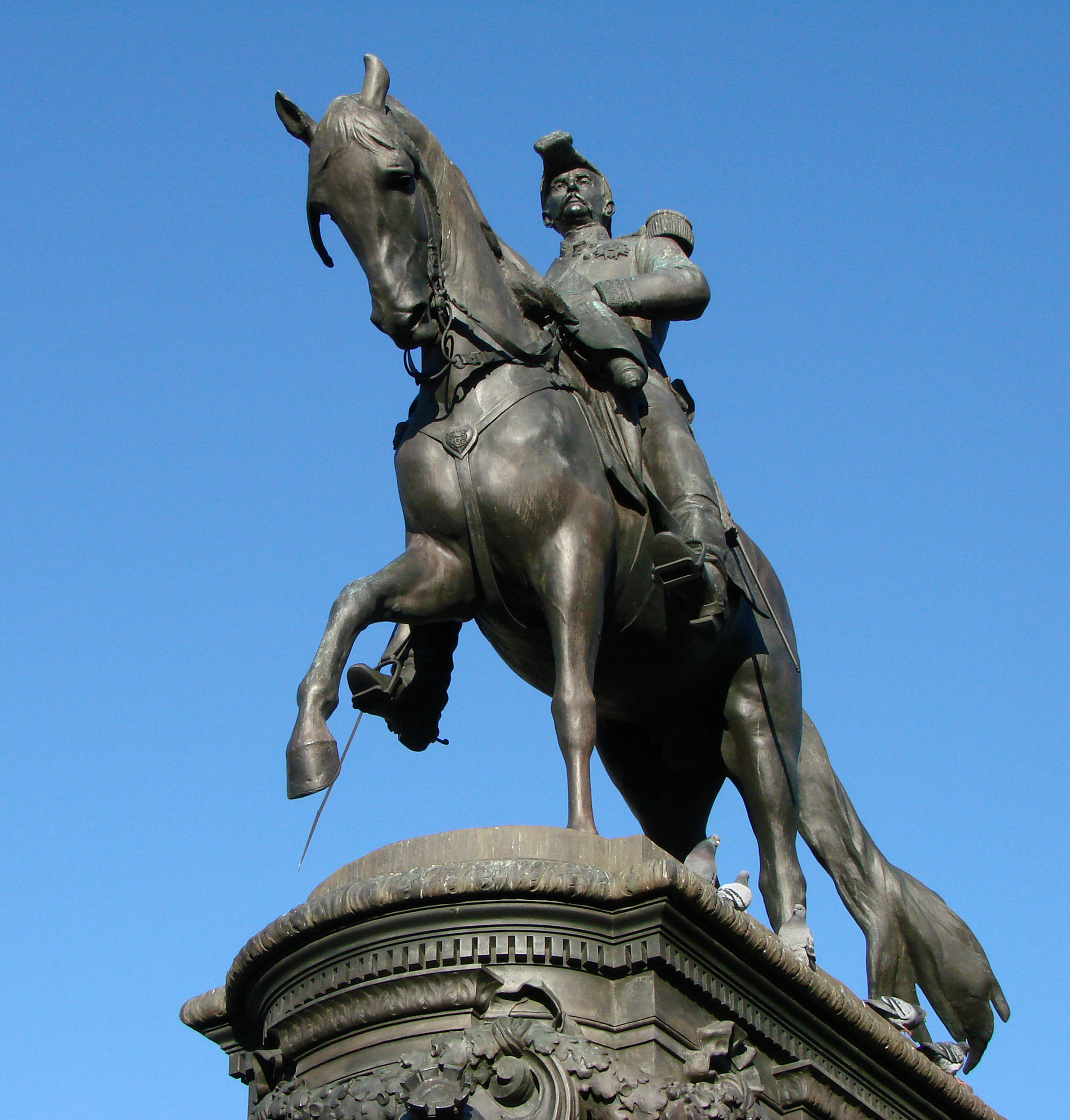
Equestrian statue of General Faidherbe in Lille.

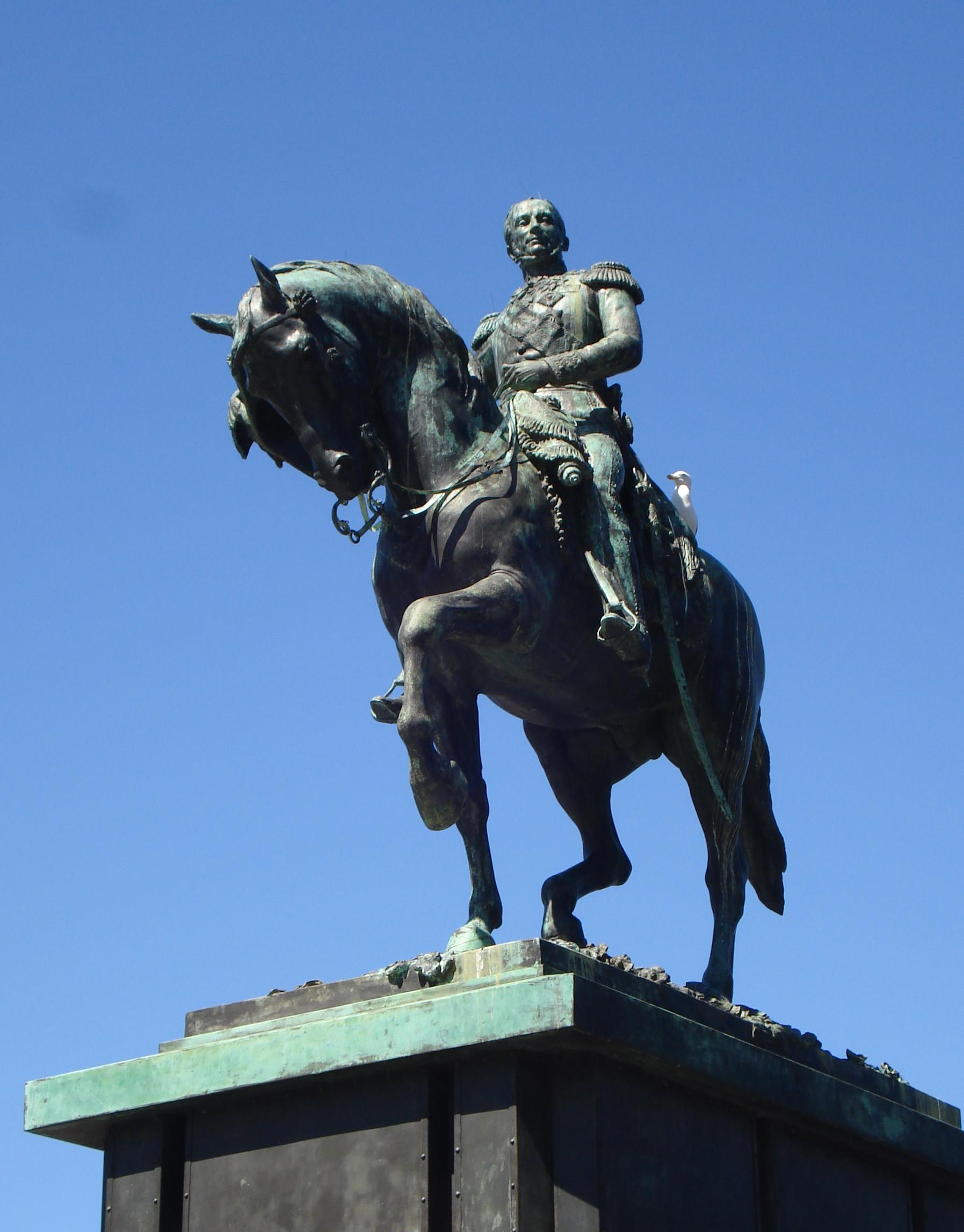
Statue of Willem II in The Hague.

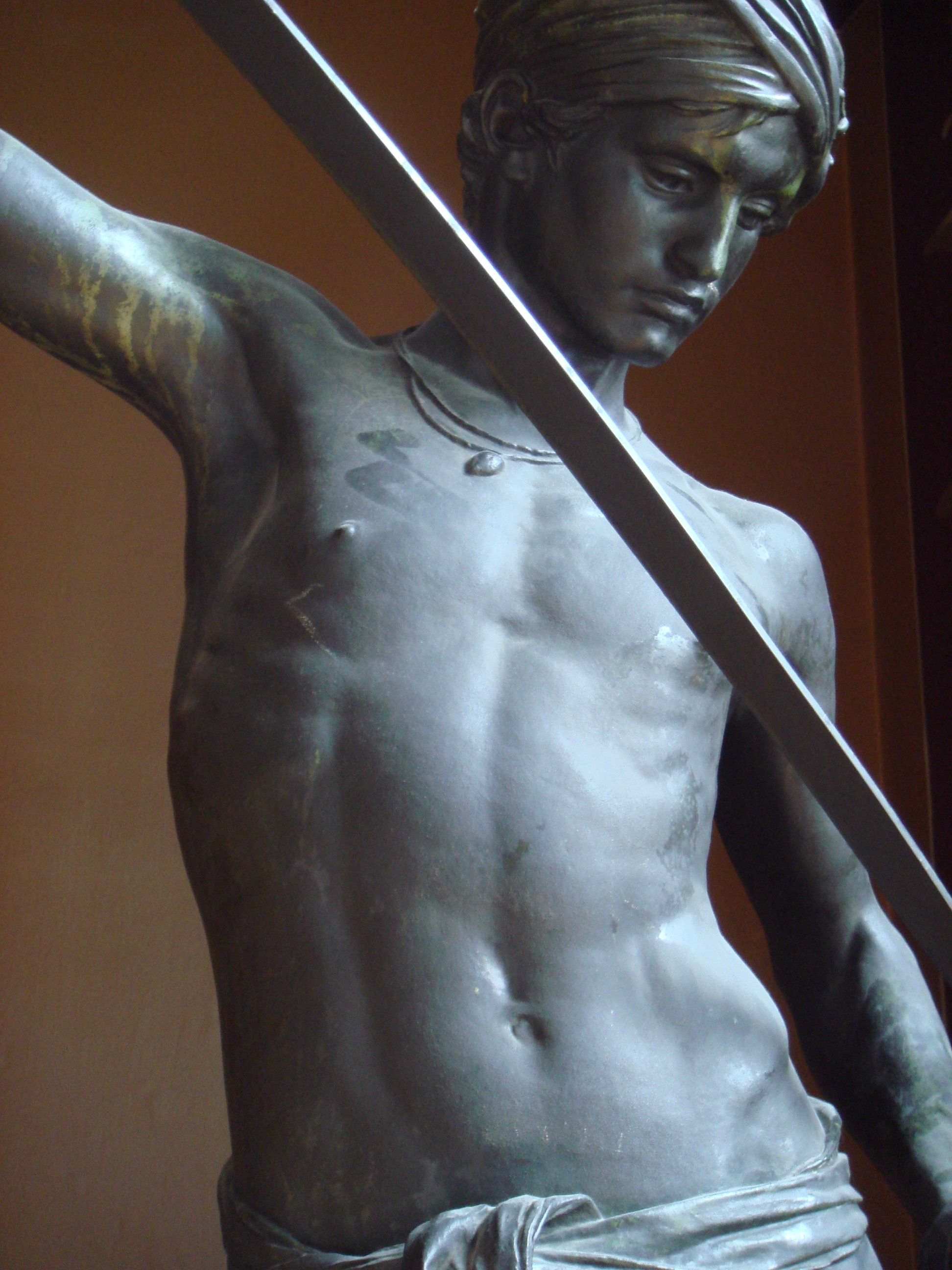
Bronze statue of David (a "clothed" version of Mercié's David) inside the University of Copenhagen.

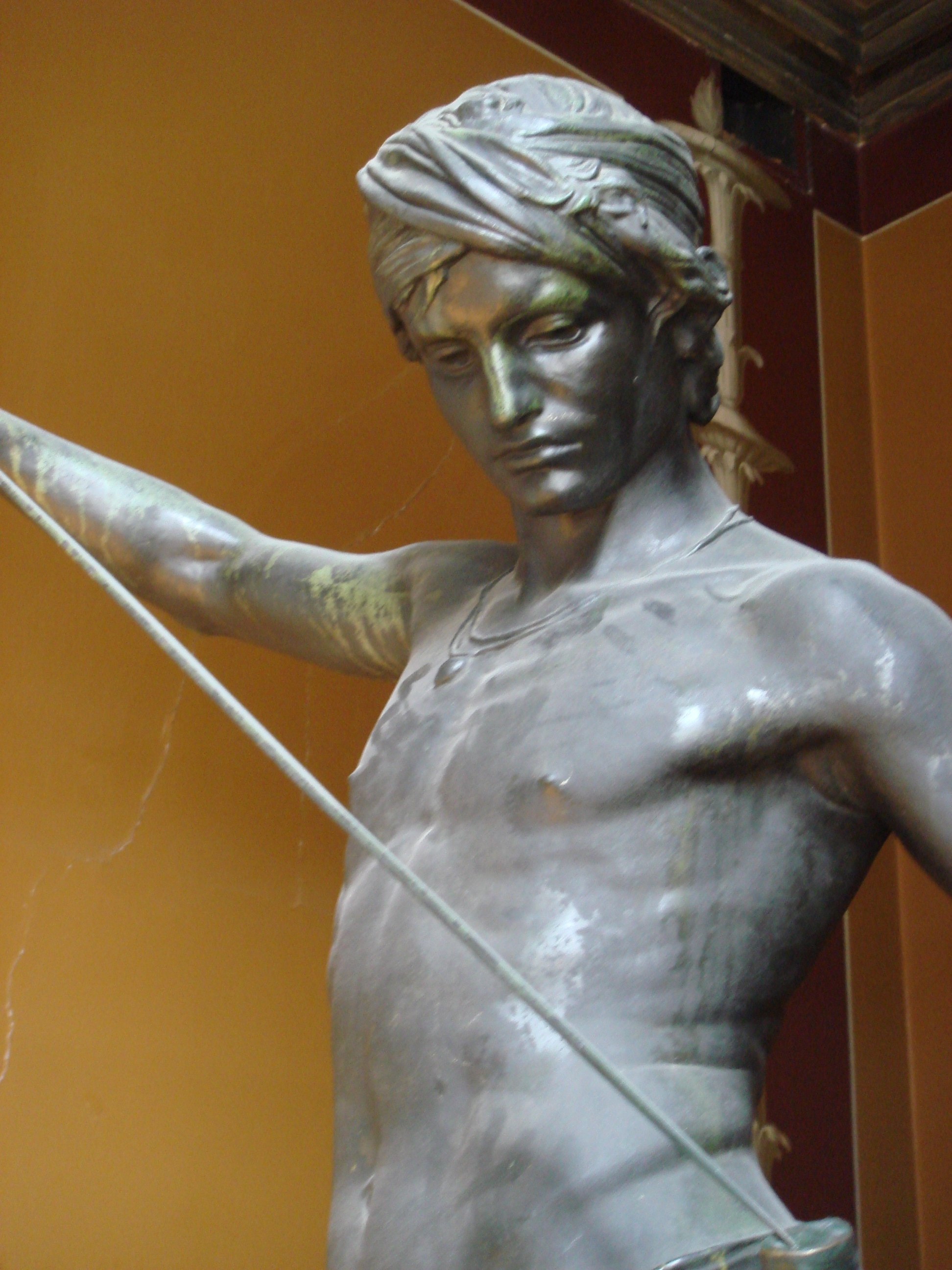
Bronze statue of David (a "clothed" version of Mercié's David) inside the University of Copenhagen.

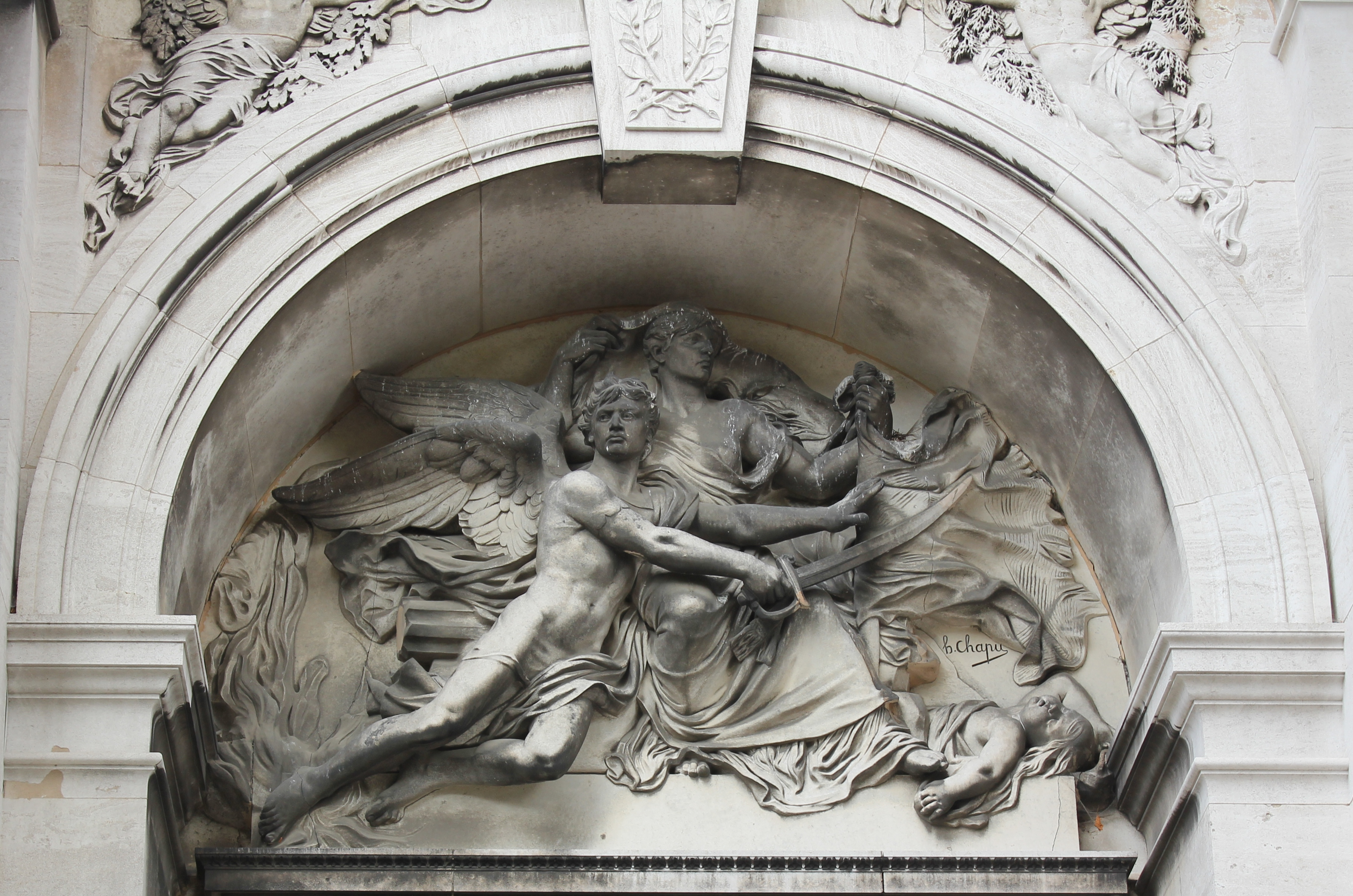
Tomb of Adolphe Thiers

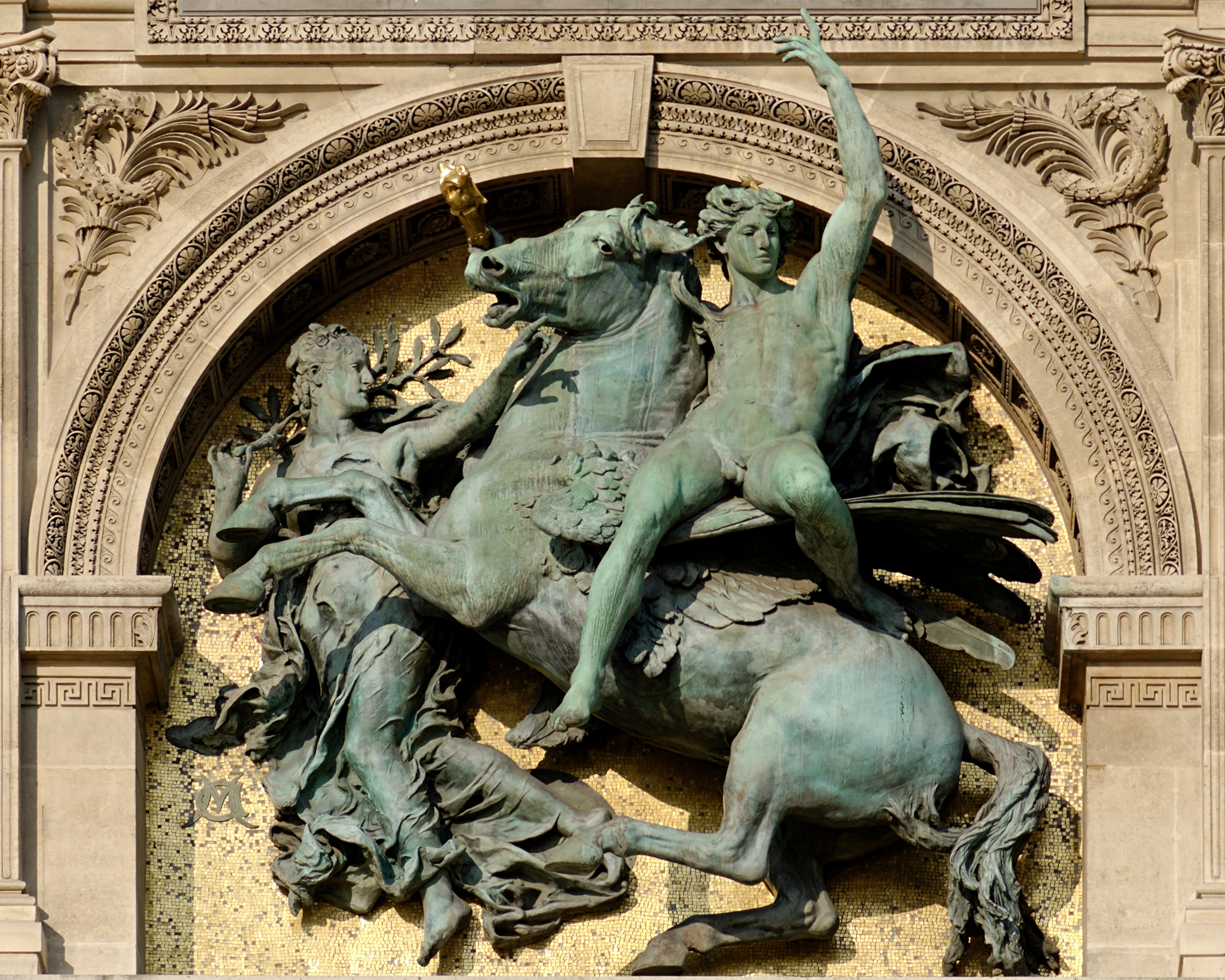
The Genius of Arts by Mercié. Can be seen on the façade of the Louvre facing the river Seine, Paris.

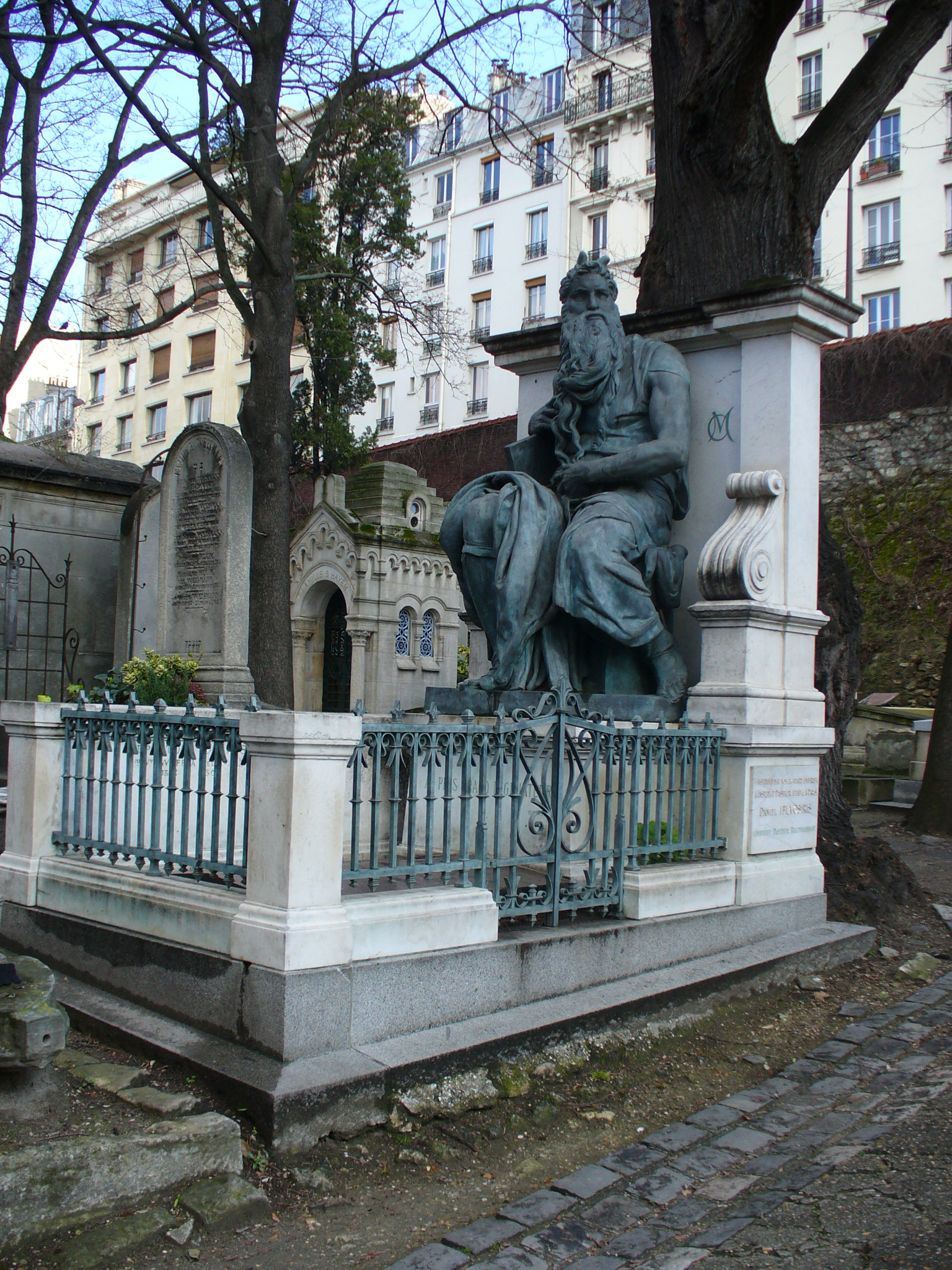
Tomb of Daniel Iffla at Montmartre Cemetery, Paris.

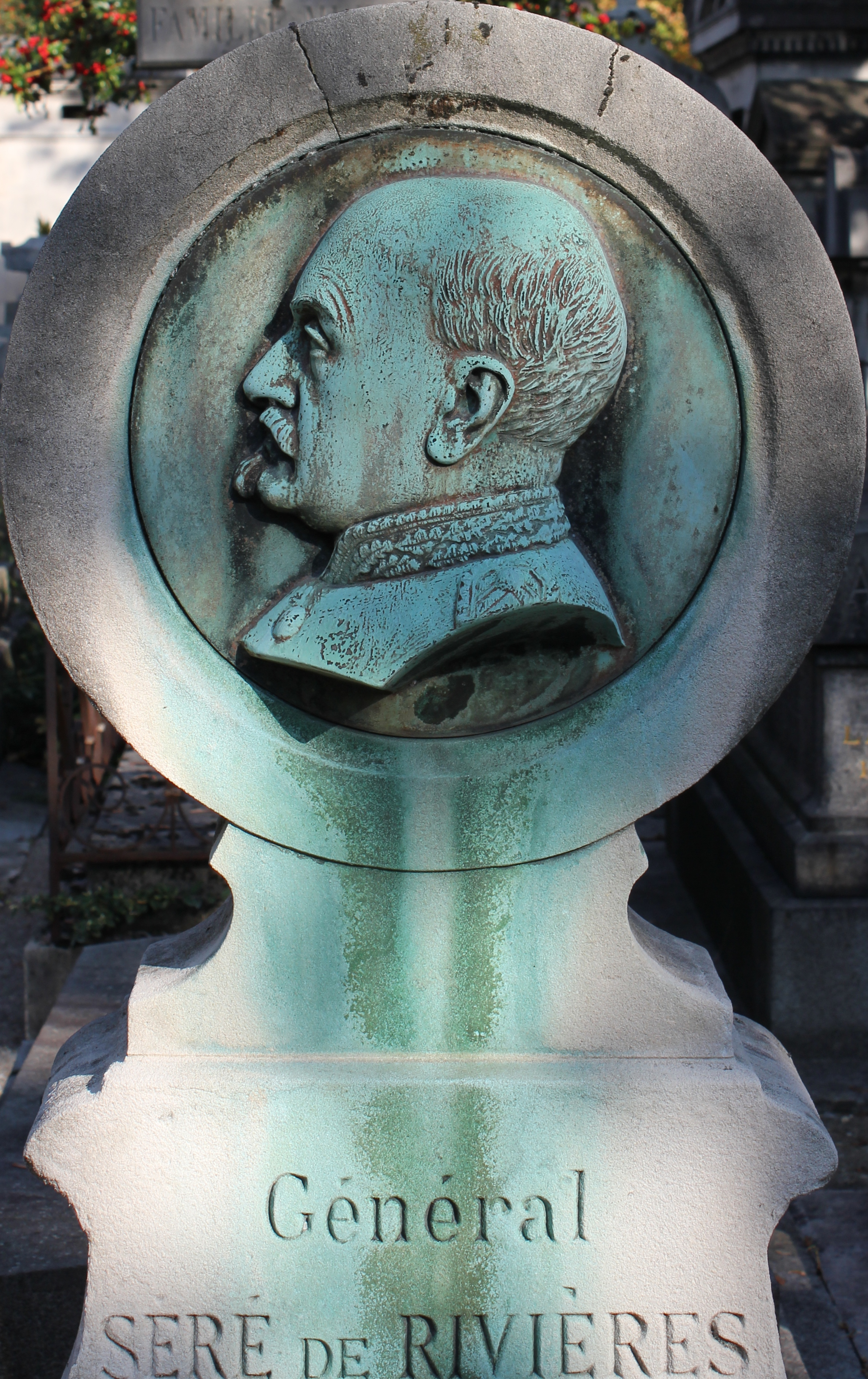
Medallion by Mercié on tomb of Raymond Séré de Rivières.

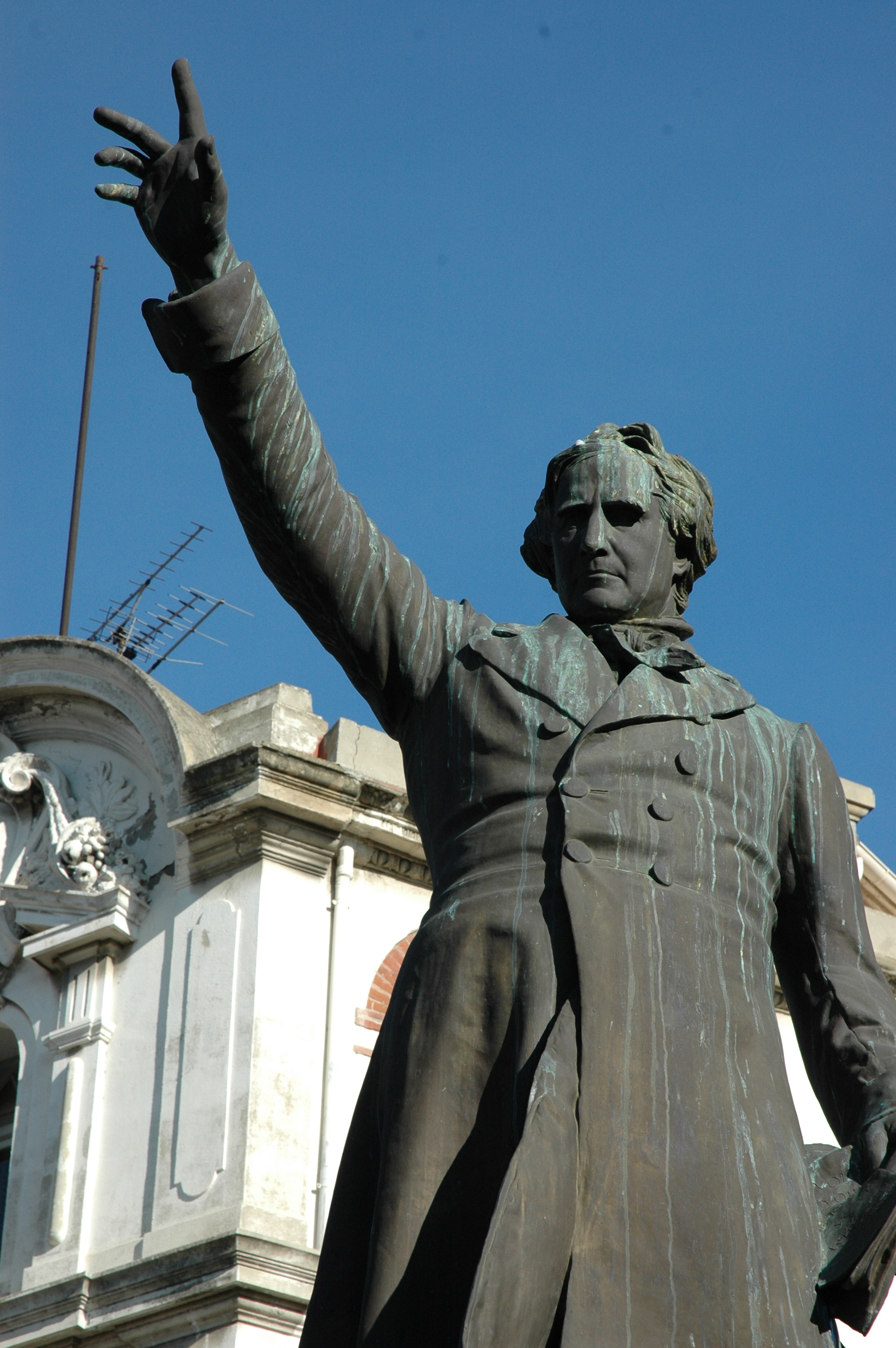
Statue of François Arago in Perpignan

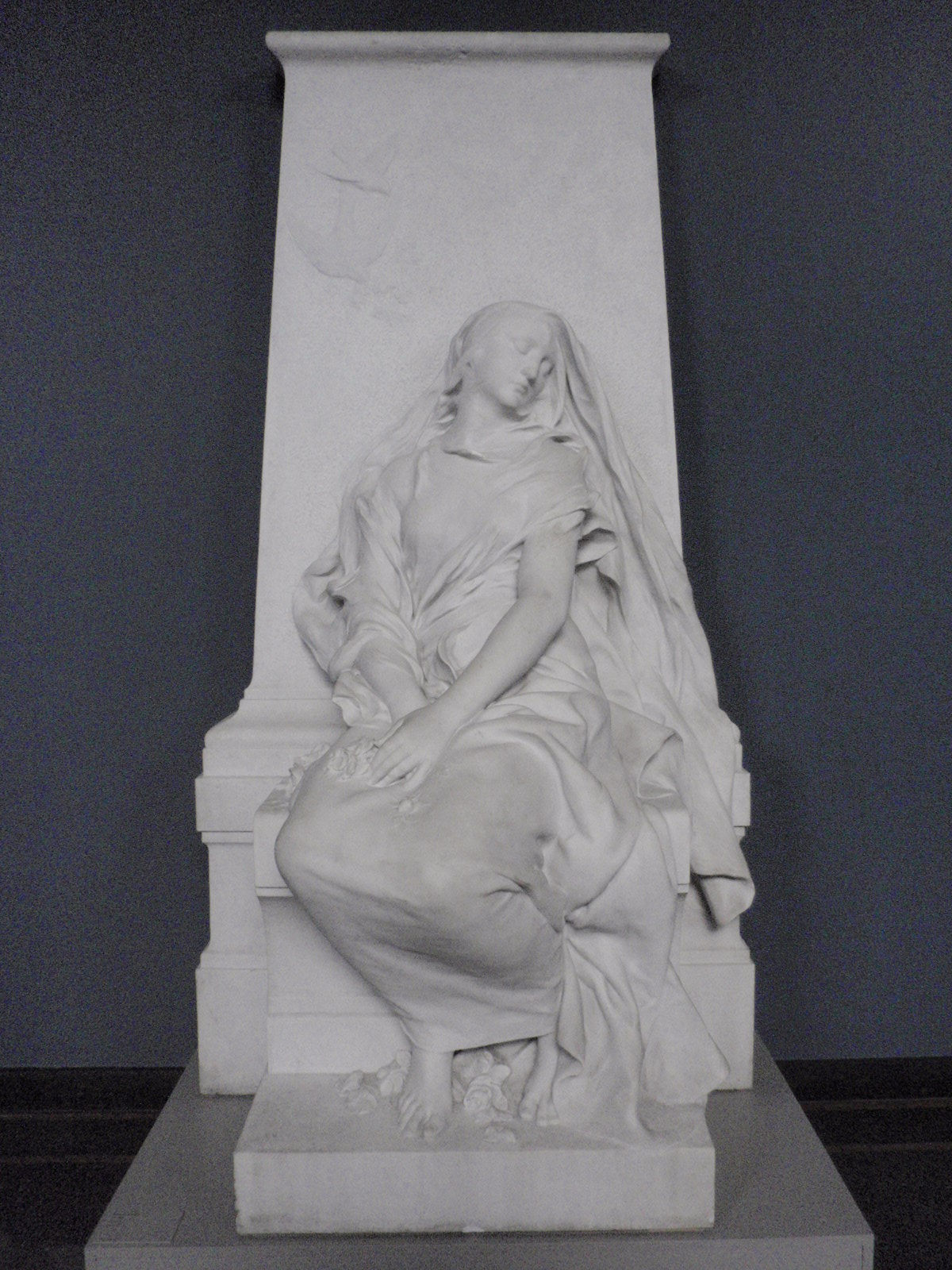
Souvenir by Mercié. There are two marble copies of Mercié's work in circulation. The one photographed here is in the Ny Carlsberg Glyptotek museum in Copenhagen, Denmark, and the second is held in Paris' Musée d'Orsay.
