= Sagebrush Trail =

1933 film

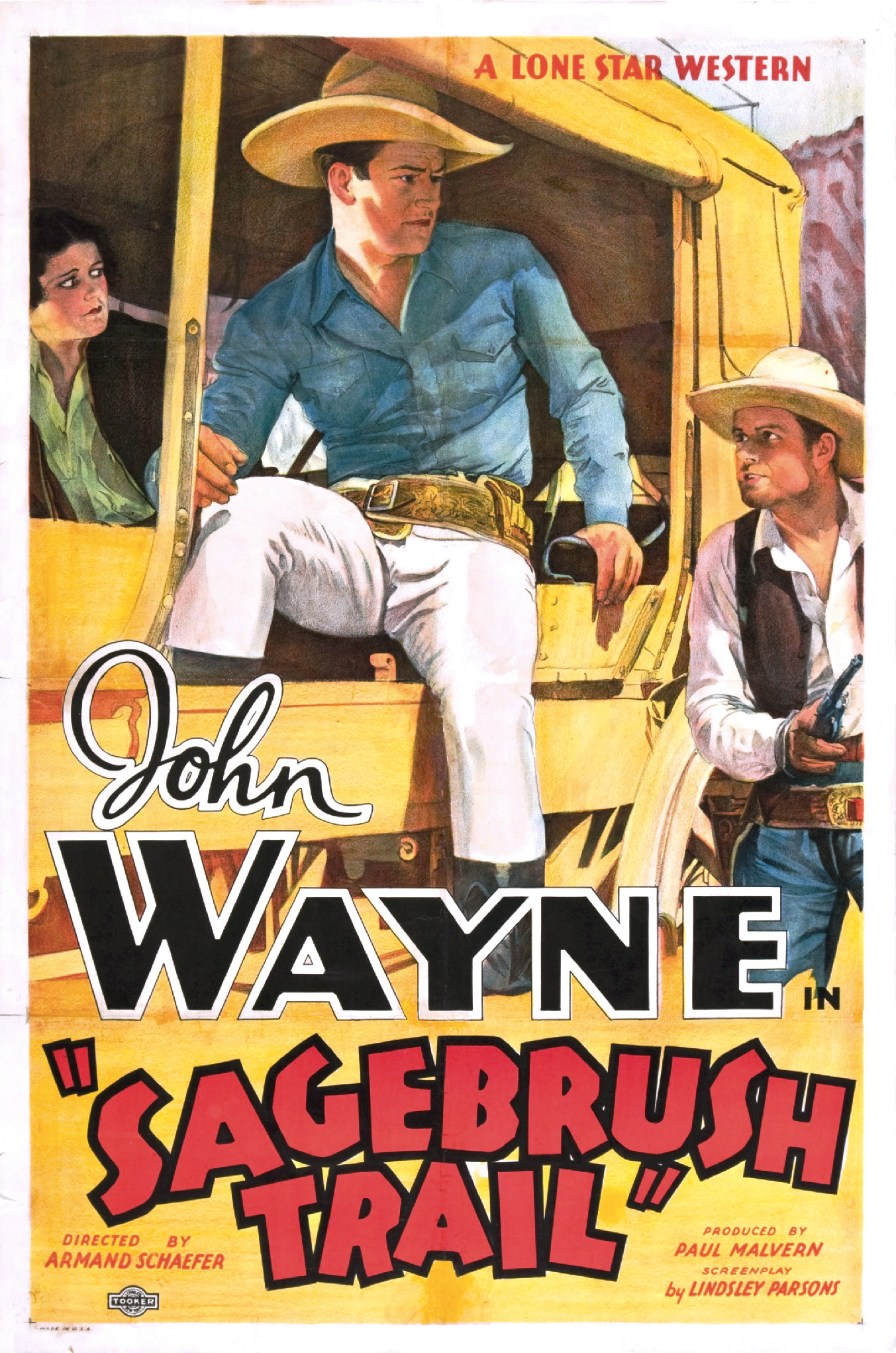
- Theatrical poster to Sagebrush Trail (1933)
- Directed by: Armand Schaefer
- Written by: Lindsley Parsons; Will Beale
- Produced by: Paul Malvern; Trem Carr
- Starring: John Wayne; Lane Chandler; Nancy Shubert; Yakima Canutt
- Cinematography: Archie Stout
- Edited by: Carl Pierson
- Distributed by: Monogram Pictures Corporation
- Release date: December 15, 1933
- Running time: 54 minutes
- Country: United States
- Language: English

Sagebrush Trail (UK title An Innocent Man) is a 1933 American Pre-Code Western film with locations filmed at Bronson Canyon starring John Wayne and featuring Lane Chandler and Yakima Canutt (Canutt plays the leader of the gang as well as doubling for Wayne in several stunts). It was the second Lone Star Productions film released by Monogram Pictures. It was shown as An Innocent Man in the UK, and this version was later released in a colorized version on home video.

== Plot ==
Sentenced for a murder he did not commit, John Brant escapes from prison determined to find the real killer. By chance Brant's narrow escape from lawmen is witnessed by Joseph Conlon who goes by the name of "Jones". Giving Brant the name of "Smith" Conlon gets him into his outlaw gang hiding out in an abandoned mine. Brant attempts to disrupt the outlaw gang's robberies and comes closer to finding his man.

The gang leader suspects John Brant/Smith but Joseph/Jones Conlon consoles him and takes him on a test run to recon a grocery store with a safe in it. John Brant writes a note to the grocery clerk (Sally Blake) warning her of the impending robbery. When Jones and Smith return later that night to rob the store the Sheriff and his Deputy are waiting. They shoot Smith who is taken by Jones to "Blind Pete's" to recover. This first robbery was deliberately spoiled by Smith in July.

In August we see Smith is fully recovered and Jones visits him and encourages him to join them in an attempt to rob a stagecoach carrying the payroll for miners. Suspecting Smith Jones disinvites him and goes to rob the coach himself with the gang. Smith intercepts the coach and robs the coach before hand, then informs Sally and asks her to tell the Sheriff to pick up the robbed money, thereby saving the payroll from being robbed.

Jones suspects Smith but is not sure. The gang leader also suspects Smith so this time he deliberately gives Smith a false tip. Jones decides to follow Smith to see if he will betray them. He soon discovers that Smith views him as a friend and took the fall for him and went to jail for him. Jones decides to save Smith who is now walking back to the gang - who are waiting to ambush him.

As Smith is about to be ambushed, Jones warns him to take cover and the two start fighting the gang surrounding them. They mount a stagecoach and escape the encircling gang. Meanwhile Sally the grocery girl on Jones' exhortation gets the help of the Sheriff and their posse and then rush to save both Jones and Smith.

Jones and Smith outrun the entire gang and then Smith drops behind and starts picking off the gang members one by one until he gets the last one. Jones however is shot and his stagecoach falls off a cliff. By the time Smith reaches Jones the Sheriff and his deputies also catch up. They hold both of them but Jones confesses to the crimes that he committed getting Smith exonerated. Smith goes off to kiss Sally as the credits roll.

== Cast ==
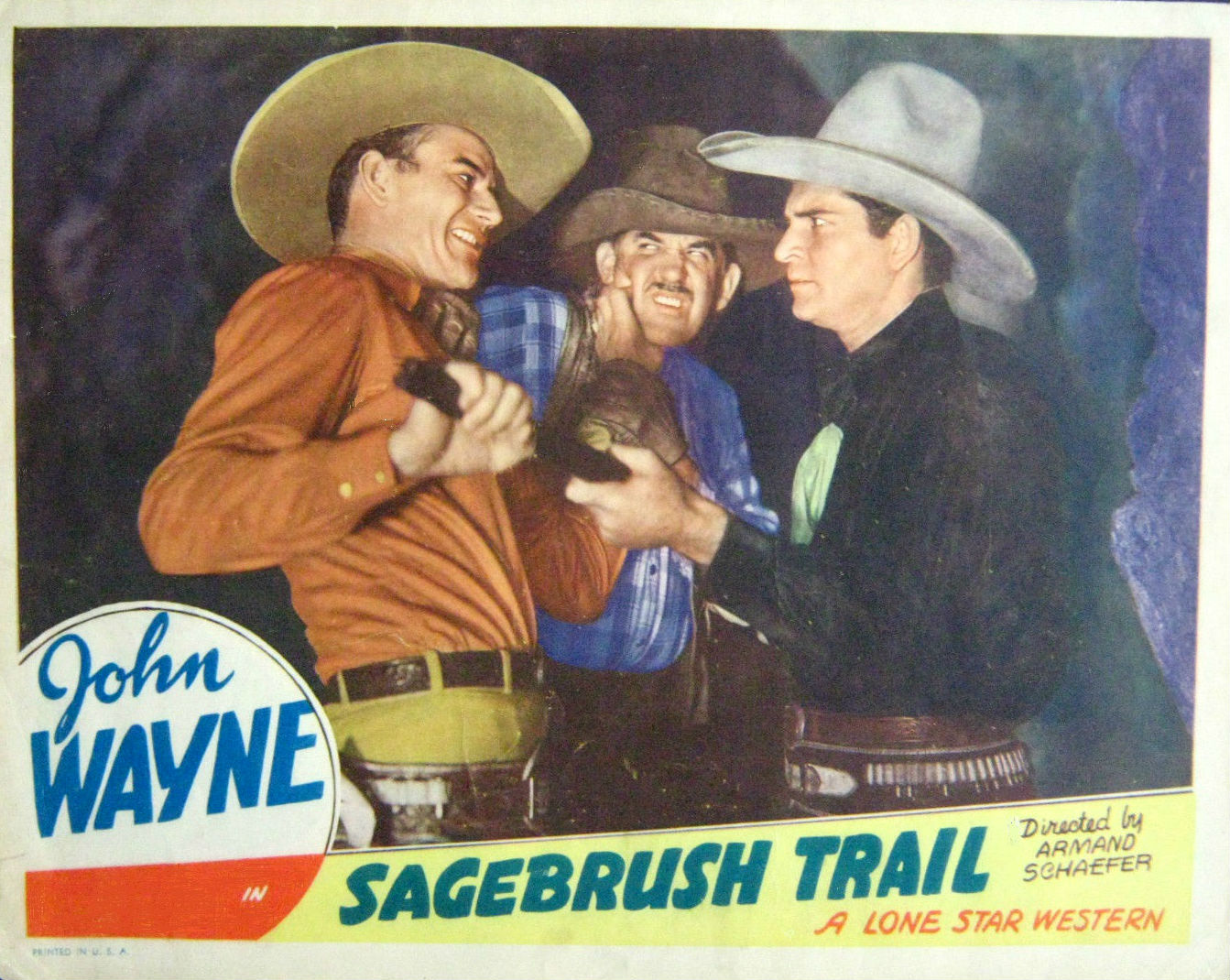
Lobby card for Sagebrush Trail (1933) with John Wayne and Yakima Canutt

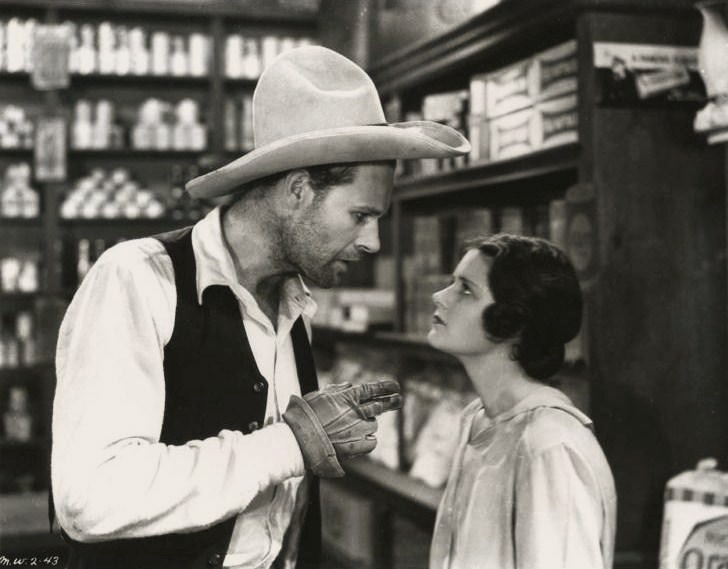
Lane Chandler and Nancy Shubert

- John Wayne as John Brant
- Nancy Shubert as Sally Blake
- Lane Chandler as Joseph Conlon
- Yakima Canutt as Outlaw Gang Leader
- Wally Wales as Deputy Sheriff
- Art Mix as Henchman
- Bob Burns as Sheriff Parker
- Ted Adams as Taggart (uncredited)
- Silver Tip Baker as Townsman (uncredited)
- Hank Bell as Henchman (uncredited)
- William Dyer as Blind Pete (uncredited)
- Wally Howe as Store Customer (uncredited)
- Julie Kingdon as Town Girl (uncredited)
- Tex Palmer as Posse Rider (uncredited)
- Tex Phelps as Henchman (uncredited)
- Hal Price as Bud - Train Engineer (uncredited)
- Archie Ricks as Stage Driver (uncredited)
- Robert Walker as Henchman (uncredited)
- Blackjack Ward as Henchman (uncredited)
- Slim Whitaker as Henchman Dick (uncredited)

== See also ==
- John Wayne filmography

== Bibliography ==
- Alonso Barahona, Fernando (2000). John Wayne. El héroe americano (in Spanish). Madrid: Ediciones Internacionales Universitarias. pp. 40–41. ISBN 84-89893-94-2.
- Aquila, Richard (2015). The Sagebrush Trail. Tucson: The University of Arizona Press. pp. 3–4. ISBN 978-0-8165-3154-7.
- Eyman, Scott (2014). John Wayne: The Life and Legend. New York: Simon & Schuster Paperbacks. pp. 74–76. ISBN 978-1-4391-9958-9.
- McGhee, Richard D. (1999). John Wayne. Actor, Artist, Hero. Jefferson: McFarland & Company, Inc., Publishers. pp. 9–10. ISBN 0-7864-0752-2.
- Pitts, Michael R. (2013). Western Movies: A Guide to 5,105 Feature Films. Jefferson: Mc Farland & Company, Inc. Publishers. p. 297. ISBN 978-0-7864-6372-5.
- Roberts, Randy; Olson, James S. (1997). John Wayne. American. Lincoln: University of Nebraska Press. ISBN 0-8032-8970-7.
- Tejero, Juan (2001). Duke, la leyenda de un gigante (in Spanish). Madrid: T&B Editores. pp. 30–88.
