= Musée Henri-Mathieu =

Museum in Vosges, France

Coordinates: 48°12′30″N 6°43′23″E

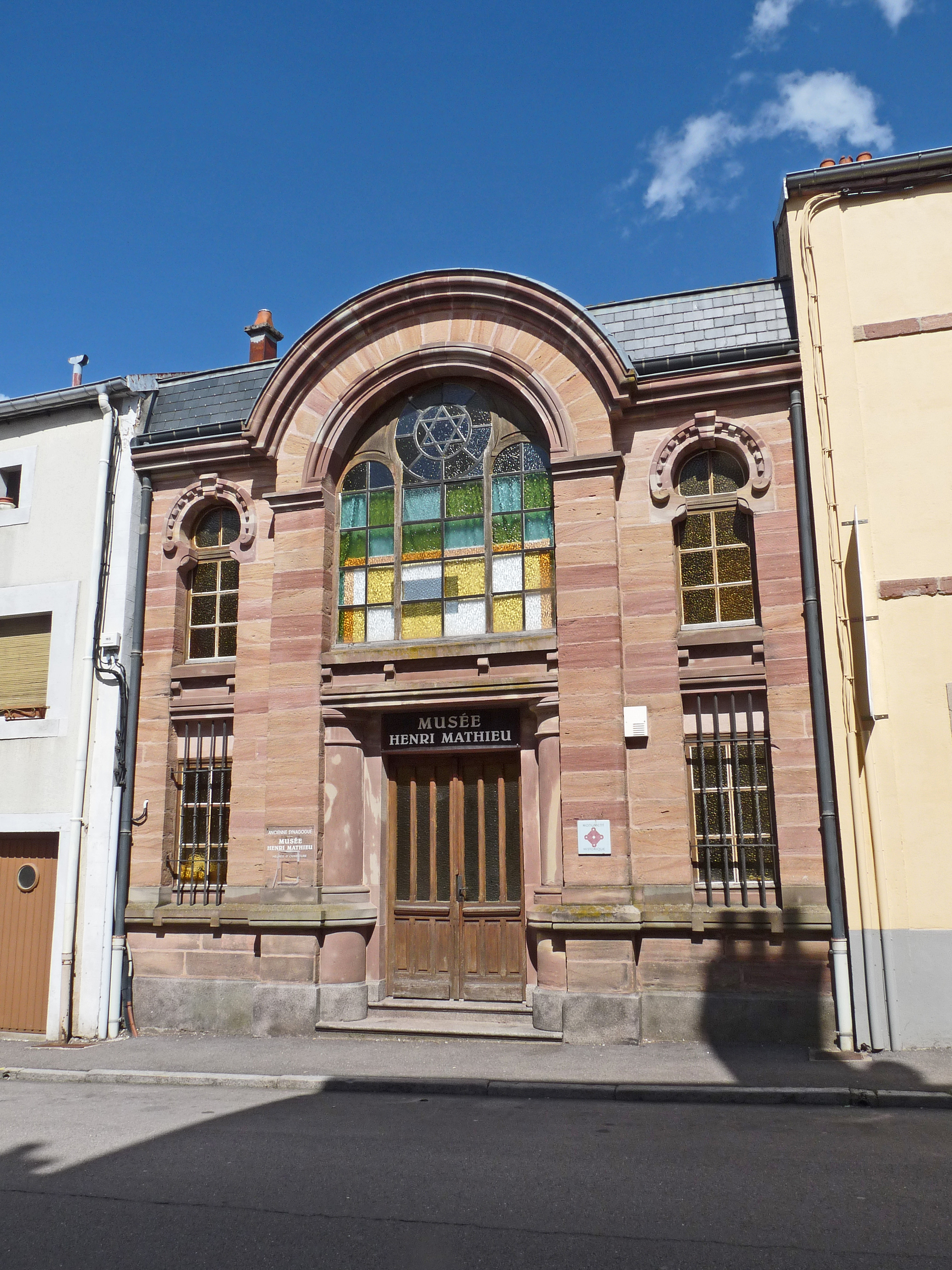
Facade of the museum

Musée Henri-Mathieu is a museum in Vosges, France. It is located in the former Bruyères Synagogue, which was built with funding from a sponsor, Daniel Osiris, for the Jewish community of Bruyères. The museum now houses a collection of Folk Art. It also includes works by Jean Lurcat, an artist born in Bruyeres.
