= Osiris (comics) =

In comics, Osiris may refer to:

- Osiris (DC Comics), there are three DC Comics characters with this name, one being known by the alter ego Amon Tomaz.
- Osiris (Marvel Comics), the Marvel Comics version of the god

== See also ==
- Osiris (disambiguation)
