= Osiris Valdés López =

Cuban-Spanish author and artist

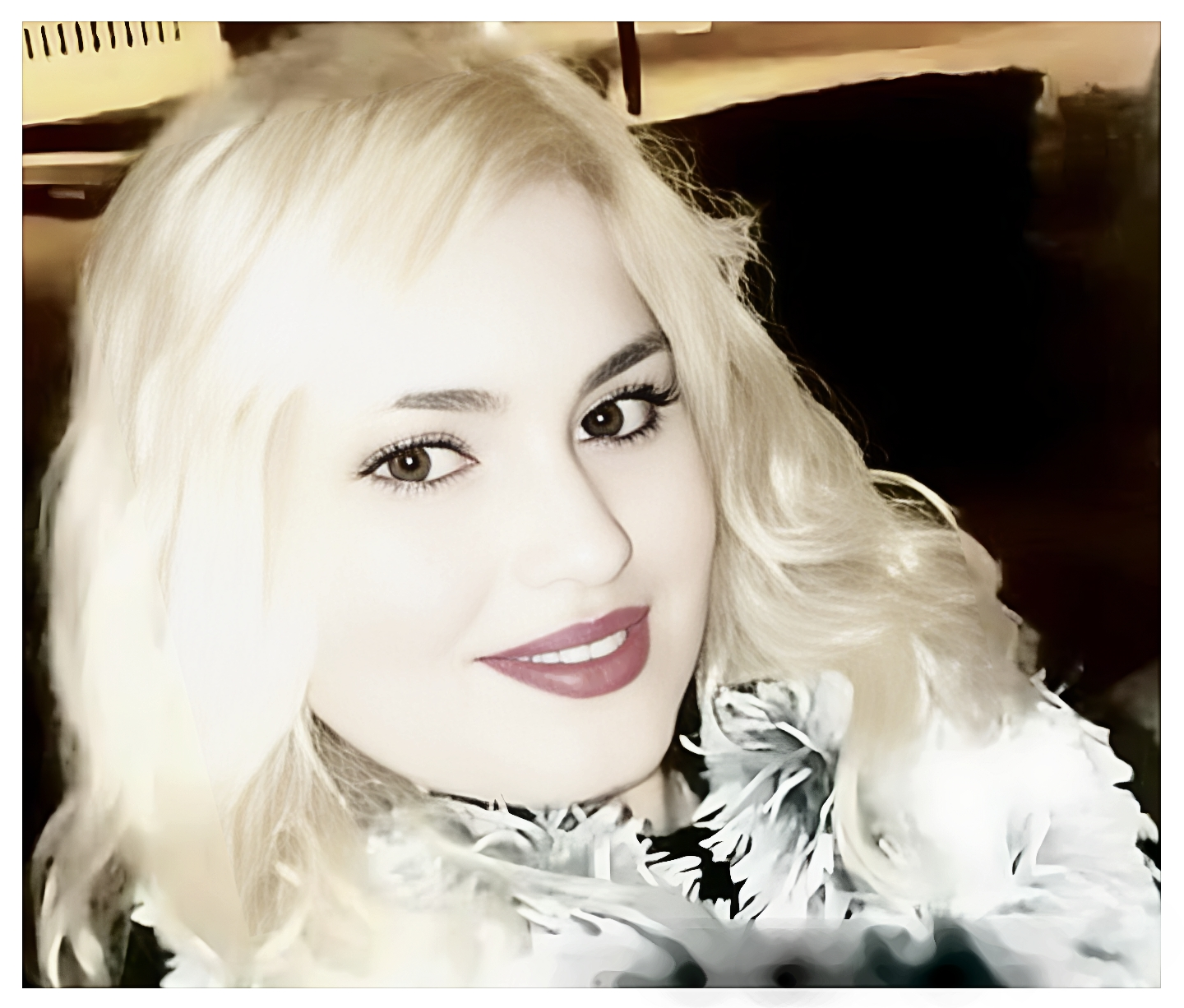
- Born: Osiris Valdés López; 15 March 1989 (age 37); Cuba
- Occupations: Author, poet, columnist, journalist, cultural activist, Businesswoman.
- Writing career
- Years active: 2017–present

Osiris Valdés López (born 15 March 1989) is a Cuban-Spanish author, poet, and journalist.

== Biography ==
Valdés was born in Havana, Cuba, of a Cuban father and Spanish mother. She attended dance and art lessons. She studied drama at the Cuban Institute of Radio and Television with Eslinda Núñez. She is an activist known for her work in support of human rights, particularly in the areas of gender equality, sexual diversity. Her commitment to these causes has been reflected in books and campaigns that aim to eradicate homophobia and promote a more inclusive environment for all people, regardless of their sexual orientation or gender identity. She lived and traveled throughout Spain from 2009 to 2022, where she was the mother of a boy named Sammy Valdés, born on the island of Mallorca on 17 January 2014. A time during which she significantly developed her literary career. In 2022, she moved to Chicago. Valdés López has established herself as a journalist since 2019, collaborating on columns in various digital media where she addresses cultural topics, and conducts interviews with prominent artists from music and literature.

== Selected works ==
- De Colores en el arcoíris. La Vanguardia. Poetry. Círculo Rojo, 2017.
- El arcoíris de mis deseos insaciables. La Vanguardia. Published by Editorial Planeta, S.A.U. Foreword by Fernando Alonso Barahona. 2021
- El Diario de Francesca
- Me sucedió en Cuba

== Awards ==
- César Vallejo Award for Journalistic Excellence (2026), Union of Hispanic World Writers
- Premio Mundial Águila de Oro, 2024, Unión Hispanomundial de Escritores
- Premio Mundial Cesar Vallejo, 2024, Unión Hispanomundial de Escritores
