= Vincennes Synagogue =

Synagogue in Vincennes, France

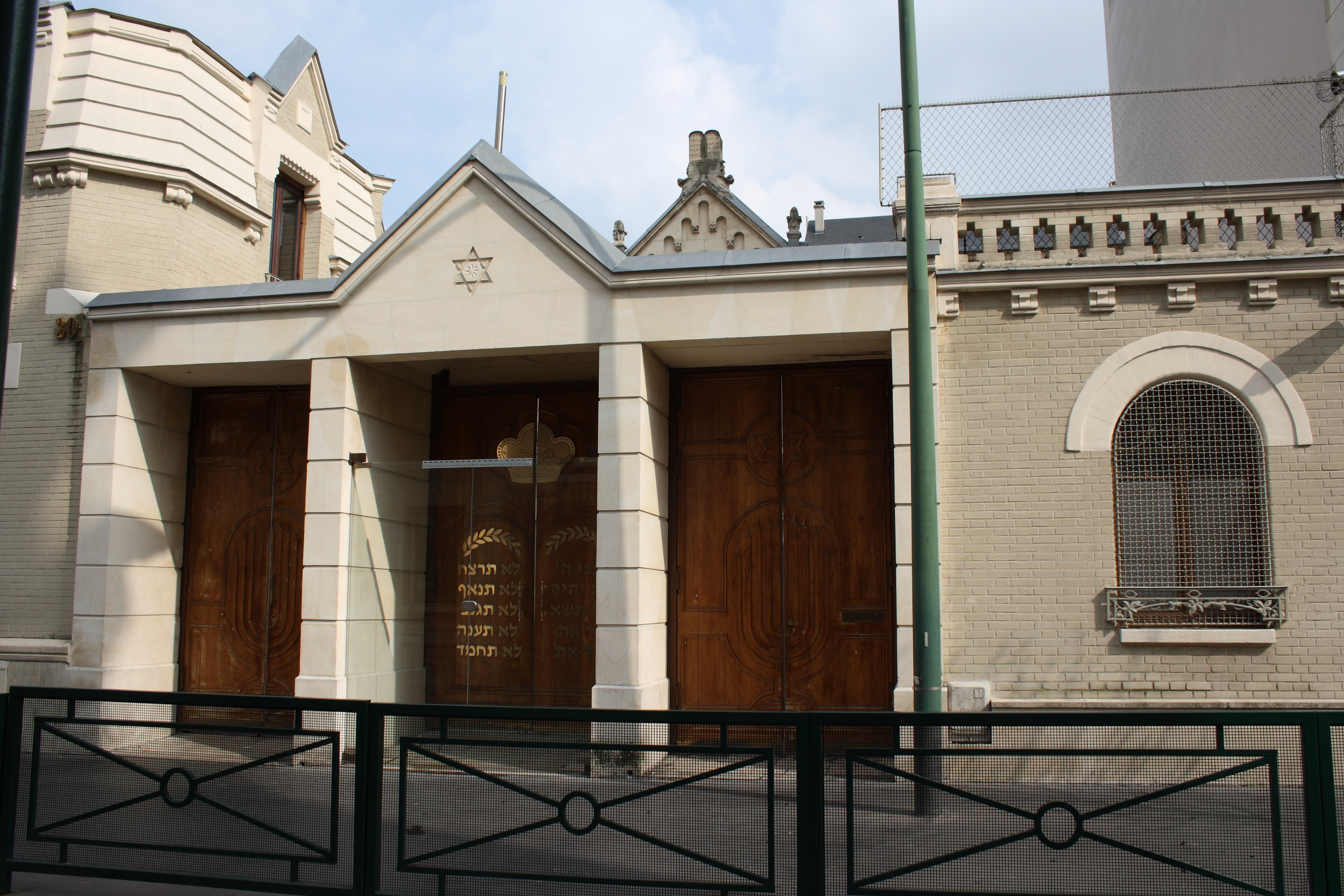
- The synagogue, in 2011

- Location of the synagogue on the edge of Paris

Religion
- Affiliation: Judaism
- Rite: Nusach Ashkenaz
- Ecclesiastical or organizational status: Synagogue
- Status: Active

Location
- Location: 30, rue Céline Robert, Vincennes, Val-de-Marne, Île-de-France
- Country: France
- Interactive map of Vincennes Synagogue
- Coordinates: 48°50′52″N 2°25′10″E

Architecture
- Architect: Victor Tondu
- Type: Synagogue architecture
- Funded by: Daniel Iffla
- Established: 1901 (as a congregation)
- Completed: 1907
- Materials: Stone

Website
- synagoguevincennes.fr (in French)

The Vincennes Synagogue is a Jewish congregation and synagogue, located at 30 rue Céline Robert, Vincennes, in the Val-de-Marne department of the Île-de-France région of France. Designed by Victor Tondu and funded by Daniel Iffla, the stone synagogue was established in 1907.

== Ashkenazi synagogue ==
In 1901, the Jewish community of Paris decided to establish a community at Saint-Mandé, encompassing Jews from Vincennes and surrounding districts. Initially most of the Jews were from Alsace, regained by France in 1870. At the end of the 19th and early 20th centuries, many Jewish families from Central Europe, fleeing poverty and pogroms came to Vincennes.

On the 13 November 1903, the community moved leasing a property at 30 rue Celine Robert where the new synagogue was to be built. The inauguration ceremony took place on September 5, 1907. Services were conducted according to the Ashkenazi rite. The synagogue is one of the few synagogues in France that was to operate almost continuously since its inception until today, even during the Vichy period.

== Sephardic synagogue ==
In 1960, following the influx of Jewish refugees from North Africa, the community of Vincennes, hitherto almost entirely Ashkenazi, adapted adopting an increasing number of Sephardic services, mostly under a Tunisian rite.

In February 2005, a new Sephardic synagogue, Beth Raphael Synagogue, was inaugurated in a building adjacent to the building of the Ashkenazi synagogue. One enters the synagogue on the northern side of the court. The style is profoundly different from the Ashkenazi synagogue. The walls are pure white, with many silver candlesticks and according to the Sephardic rite, the bimah is located in the middle of the room. The women's gallery on the first floor, walls west, north and south, has no railing, but is protected by glass panels.

A community center, located across the street, includes classrooms for a cheder, and banquet halls.

== See also ==
- History of the Jews in France
- List of synagogues in France

== Additional reading ==
- Jarrassé, Dominique (2003). Guide du Patrimoine Juif Parisien (in French). Paris: Parigramme. pp. 91–92. ISBN 2-84096-247-0.
