= Synagogue of Arcachon =

Synagogue in Arcachon, France

- French: Synagogue d'Arcachon
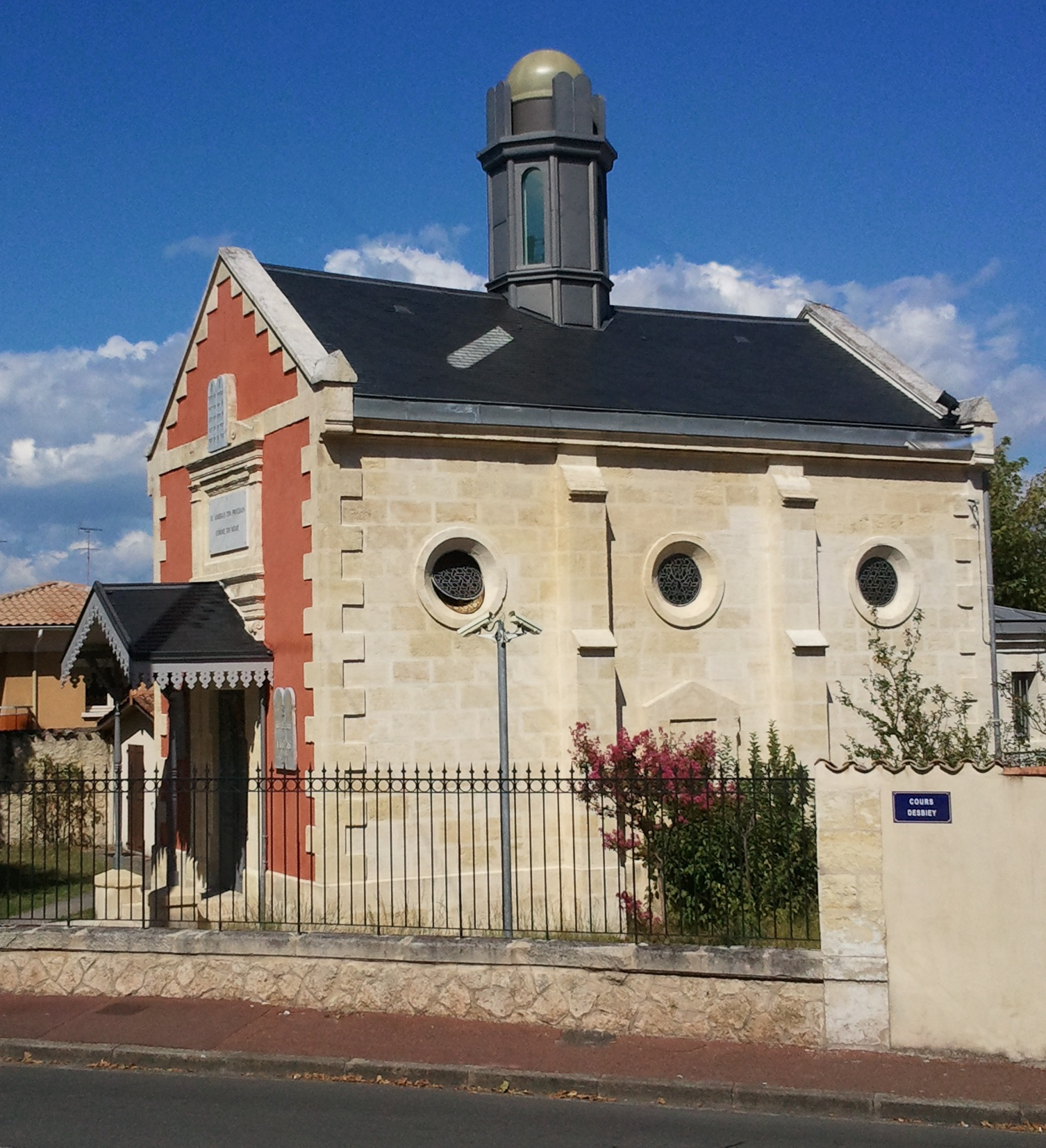
- The synagogue in 2013

- Location of the synagogue in France

Religion
- Affiliation: Judaism
- Rite: Nusach Sefard
- Ecclesiastical or organizational status: Synagogue
- Leadership: Rabbi Eric-Meyer Aziza
- Status: Active

Location
- Location: Arcachon, Gironde, Nouvelle-Aquitaine
- Country: France
- Interactive map of Synagogue of Arcachon
- Coordinates: 44°39′30″N 1°10′05″W

Architecture
- Architect: Stanislas Ferrand
- Type: Synagogue architecture
- Funded by: Daniel Iffla
- Completed: 1879
- Materials: Stone

Website
- synagogue-arcachon.com

Monument historique
- Official name: Synagogue d'Arcachon
- Type: Base Mérimée
- Designated: 3 December 2004
- Reference no.: PA33000080

The Synagogue of Arcachon (French: Synagogue d'Arcachon), also Synagogue Temple Osiris, is a Jewish congregation and synagogue, located at 36 Avenue Gambetta in Arcachon, Gironde, in the Nouvelle-Aquitaine region of France. The congregation, Communauté Juive du Bassin d’Arcachon (in French), worships in the Sephardic rite. (Note: Although one source claims that the congregation worships in the Ashkenazi rite.)

== History ==
Daniel Iffla of Bordeaux, who went by the name Osiris, an eccentric industrialist, financed the construction of the private synagogue that was opened on December 21, 1879, when Osiris' niece, singer Emma Moyse, married Sigismund Bardac. Osiris subsequently donated the building to the Israelite Regional Consistory of Bordeaux, itself a member of the Central Israelite Consistory of France.

The location was strategically chosen on the street leading from the Thiers Jetty and the rail station in Arcachon. In 1895, Iffla built the "Alexandre-Dumas villa" in the style of other villas in Arcachon, at 1 allée Brémontier in Arcachon, about a 10-minute walk from the synagogue.

During a round-up of Jews on January 10, 1944, organized by French collaborator Maurice Papon, twelve Jews from Arcachon were arrested. They were originally brought to the Grand Synagogue of Bordeaux before later being transported by train with 305 other Jewish prisoners to Drancy internment camp, and later to different Nazi concentration camps, where they were killed. The Normandy landings would happen only six months later.

Religious services are offered year round. Since 2012, the synagogue's rabbi has been Eric-Meyer Aziza, who is secretary-general of Jewish-Christian Friendship of France and is heavily involved in Interfaith dialogue.

== Architecture ==
The synagogue was designed by Stanislas Ferrand and was built in a rectangle, meant to invoke the style of classic synagogues from the 19th century. In 2004, the building was listed as a Monument historique of France. It was renovated in 2011.

Inside, the Torah ark is semi-circular area inspired by Tuscan style and decorated with Bezants. Along the sides of the Ark are replicas of the stone tablets of the Ten Commandments. The bimah is in the middle of the nave, as is customary with Sephardic Judaism.

On the façade, the upper part of the gable, held by two pillars, is engraved with:

You shall love your neighbor as yourself

— Leviticus 19:18

The verse, which is frequently cited by Jesus to his Disciples speaks to the importance of interfaith dialogue to the community. Above the engraving is another representation of the Stone Tablets of the Ten Commandments. The two tablets are headed with the initials

R. F.

for République française, affirming support for the then-Third Republic.

== See also ==
- History of the Jews in France
- List of synagogues in France
- Spanish and Portuguese Jews
