= Flying Laptop =

German satellite

The Flying Laptop is a German satellite, launched on 14 July 2017 on a Soyuz-2.1a launch vehicle from Baikonur Cosmodrome in Kazakhstan, and hosting the OSIRISv1 laser communications experiment. The satellite has a total mass of 110 kg. It operates at a 600 kilometres (370 mi) Sun-synchronous orbit with an inclination of 97.6 degrees.

The satellite is part of the Stuttgart Small Satellite Program, a program led by the German Space Agency.

Optical communications tests have been carried out with ground stations in Japan, Europe, and Canada, with a data rate of up to 200 Mbit/s, from orbit to ground only.

The two fixed lasers of OSIRISv1 are aimed at ground stations by 'body pointing', attitude control of the entire satellite, using four reaction wheels. The reaction wheels can be desaturated using three internal magnetorquers.

Flying Laptop carries a de-orbit mechanism called DOM2500 developed by Tohoku University and manufactured by Nakashimada Engineering Works, Ltd., which upon activation will unfurl a sail to increase atmospheric drag. The device will be used at the end of the satellite mission.

== See also ==
- Laser communication in space
