= Optical Space Infrared Downlink System =

Optical Space Infrared Downlink System (OSIRIS) is an experimental program of DLR's Institute of Communications and Navigation (at Stuttgart university, Germany).

OSIRISv1 was hosted on the Flying Laptop satellite. to test 200 Mbit/s.

OSIRISv2 was hosted on the BiROS satellite. to test 1 Gbit/s.

ORIRISv3 was due to test 10 Gbit/s from the ISS in 2020.

OSIRIS4cubesat are in development.

== See also ==
- Laser communication in space
