= Fernando Alonso Barahona =

Spanish lawyer, film critic, and writer

- Born: 1961 (age 64–65); Madrid, Spain
- Occupations: Lawyer, film critic, writer
- Known for: Film critique, literary works
- Website: La Vanguardia

Fernando Alonso Barahona (born 1961) is a Spanish lawyer, film critic, and writer. He is known for his insightful film critiques and contributions to literary works. He holds Spanish nationality and has a distinguished career in both the legal field and the arts.

== Biography ==
Born in Madrid in November 1961, Fernando Alonso is a multifaceted individual, balancing his professional career with a passion for writing and film analysis. Over the years, he has contributed to a variety of publications, from the fanzine L'Hork to the Ya newspaper. His works include poetry, political essays, studies on horror cinema, and novels.

Alonso graduated in law from the Autonomous University of Madrid and, since 1986, has held a position as a senior official with the Community of Madrid. His career in public administration includes leadership roles within the municipal governments of Madrid, Alcalá de Henares, Boadilla del Monte, and Coslada.

A prolific collaborator in both print and digital media, Alonso has written for numerous magazines on topics related to cinema, culture, and intellectual thought. He served on the Board of the Association of Friends of Julián Marías until 1993 and was actively involved in the boards of the Cinematographic Writers’ Circle and FEDECA. Furthermore, he is a member of the Royal Economic Society of Friends of the Country and has been a juror for the National Literature Awards (2003), the National Theatre Awards (2004), and the Cultura Viva Awards (2006-2007).

== Selected works ==
- Cecil B. De Mille (1991)
- Cine, ideas y arte (1991)
- King Vidor (1992)
- Antropología del cine (1992)
- Biografía del cine español (1992)
- Charlton Heston (1992)
- Sean Connery (1992)
- Michael Douglas (1992)
- Cien películas de terror (1992)
- Gary Cooper (1994)
- La derecha del siglo XXI (1994)
- Las obras maestras del cine (1994)
- Chuck Norris (1994)
- John Wayne (1995)
- Las mentiras sobre el cine español (1995, in collaboration)
- Asesoramiento municipal (1996)
- Informes Municipales (1997)
- Anthony Mann (1997)
- Rafael Gil: director de cine (1997)
- Paul Naschy (1997)
- Informes de Administración Local (1998)
- Historia del terror a través del cine (1998)
- Políticamente incorrecto (1998)
- Administración Local Práctica (1999)
- Charlton Heston, la épica de un héroe (1999)
- El libro del concejal (1999)
- John Wayne, el héroe americano (2000)
- El sueño de la vida (poemas) (2000)
- McCarthy o la historia ignorada del cine (2000)
- Viaje hacia el amor -poemas- (2001)
- Perón o el espíritu del pueblo (2003)
- Rafael Gil, escritor de cine (2004)
- Todo sobre Ingrid Bergman (2005)
- ¿Quién es John McCain? (2008)
- La restauración (novela, 2008)
- Círculo de mujeres (novela, 2010)
- El rapto de la diosa (poemas) 2014
- Tres poemas de mujer (teatro, 2016)
- Cartas del silencio (poemas, 2017)
- Retrato de ella (novela, 2018)
- Figuras en un espejo (novela, 2019)
- El cine español en la era de Franco (2022)
- Falange, historia, cine y cultura (2023)
- Charlton Heston, un héroe para la eternidad (2023, with Juanma de la Poza)
- Cecil B. de Mille, un director de leyenda (2023, with Juanma de la Poza)
- El libro del concejal ( 2023 )
- Castilla y León. Territorios míticos ( 2023 )
- Locura para el mundo (theatre, 2023)
- Perón, una biografía argentina (2024)
- Antología Sisifo. ( theatre ) 2024
- Pedazos de tiempo. ( novel ) 2025
