= Daniel Iffla =

French philanthropist

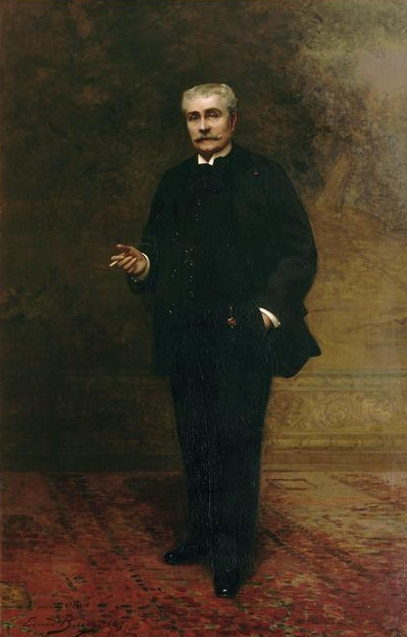
Portrait of Daniel Iffla, by Édouard Bisson, 1897

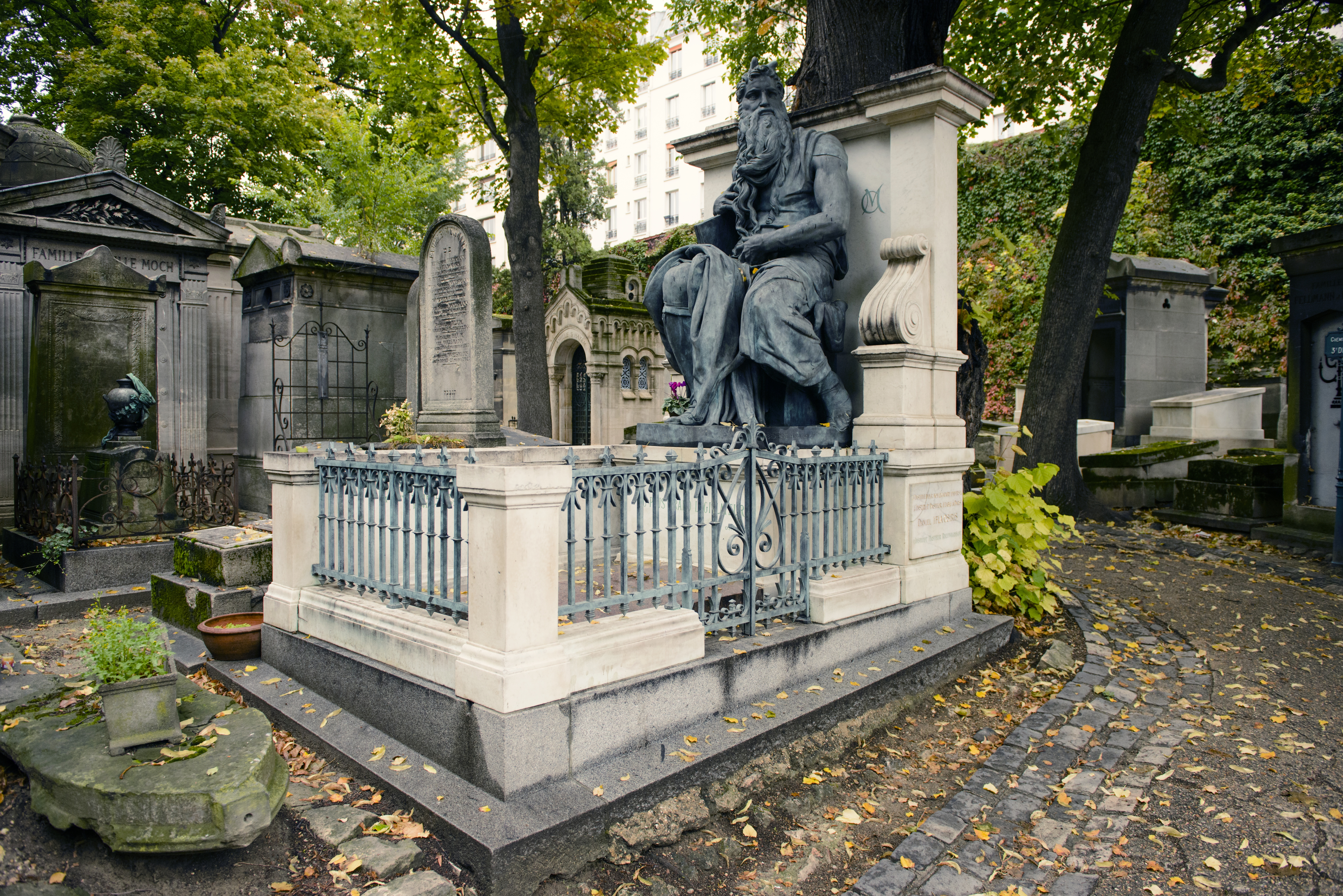
Tomb of Daniel Iffla at Montmartre Cemetery

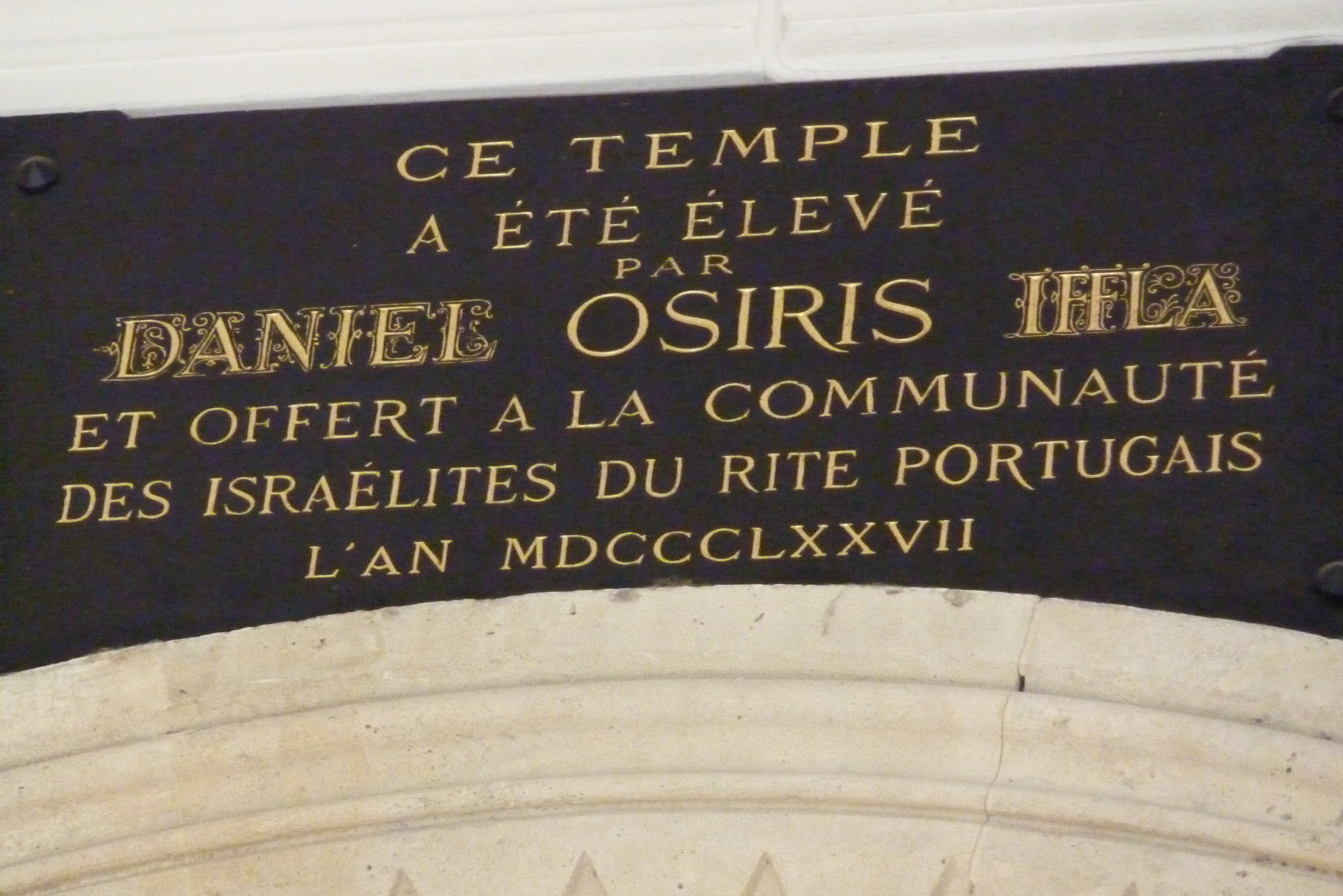
Paris Synagogue Buffault plaque

Daniel Iffla (1825–1907), known as Osiris, was a financier and philanthropist.

== Biography ==
Born into a Jewish family of Moroccan origin in Bordeaux, France, he made his fortune in Paris in the bank of Jules Mirès and Moïse Polydore Millaud. It invested in the Spanish railways, which earned him the Order of Isabella.

He devoted himself to philanthropy after the death of his wife Leonie Carlier, a year after she gave birth to two children.

His obsession with philanthropy emerged from the Jewish tradition of the tzedakah (charity), republican values and the irrepressible desire to spread his wealth. He built a statue in honor of Joan of Arc in Nancy, and an impressive collection of Napoleonic relics, bequeathed to the Pasteur Institute.

Disapproving of the conduct of his nieces, one of which was the mistress of Claude Debussy, he bequeathed his fortune to the Pasteur Institute (which used it in part for the creation of the Radium Institute) as well as assorted other charitable institutions.

Iffla built several synagogues in Paris, including the Buffault Synagogue, at Arcachon, one in Tours, and also the Vincennes Synagogue, as well as synagogues in Tunis and Lausanne. In the latter city, he also constructed a statue of William Tell (in gratitude to the Swiss for their reception of the army of Bourbaki in 1871).

His grave in Paris is made of white marble surmounted by a large bronze reproduction of Michelangelo's statue Moses, from the church San Pietro in Vincoli, Rome.

== Notes ==
=== Bibliography ===
- Dominique Jarrassé,Osiris, patron Jewish nationalist French. Daniel Iffla (1825-1907).Editions of Aesthetic Miscellaneous, 2009.

=== Filmography ===
- The Incredible Forgotten Story of Daniel Iffla Osiris, One of the Greatest Philanthropists of the 19th Century (2026), documentary series (Director: Joanna Nahon).
