= Marie-Antoinette Demagnez =

French sculptor

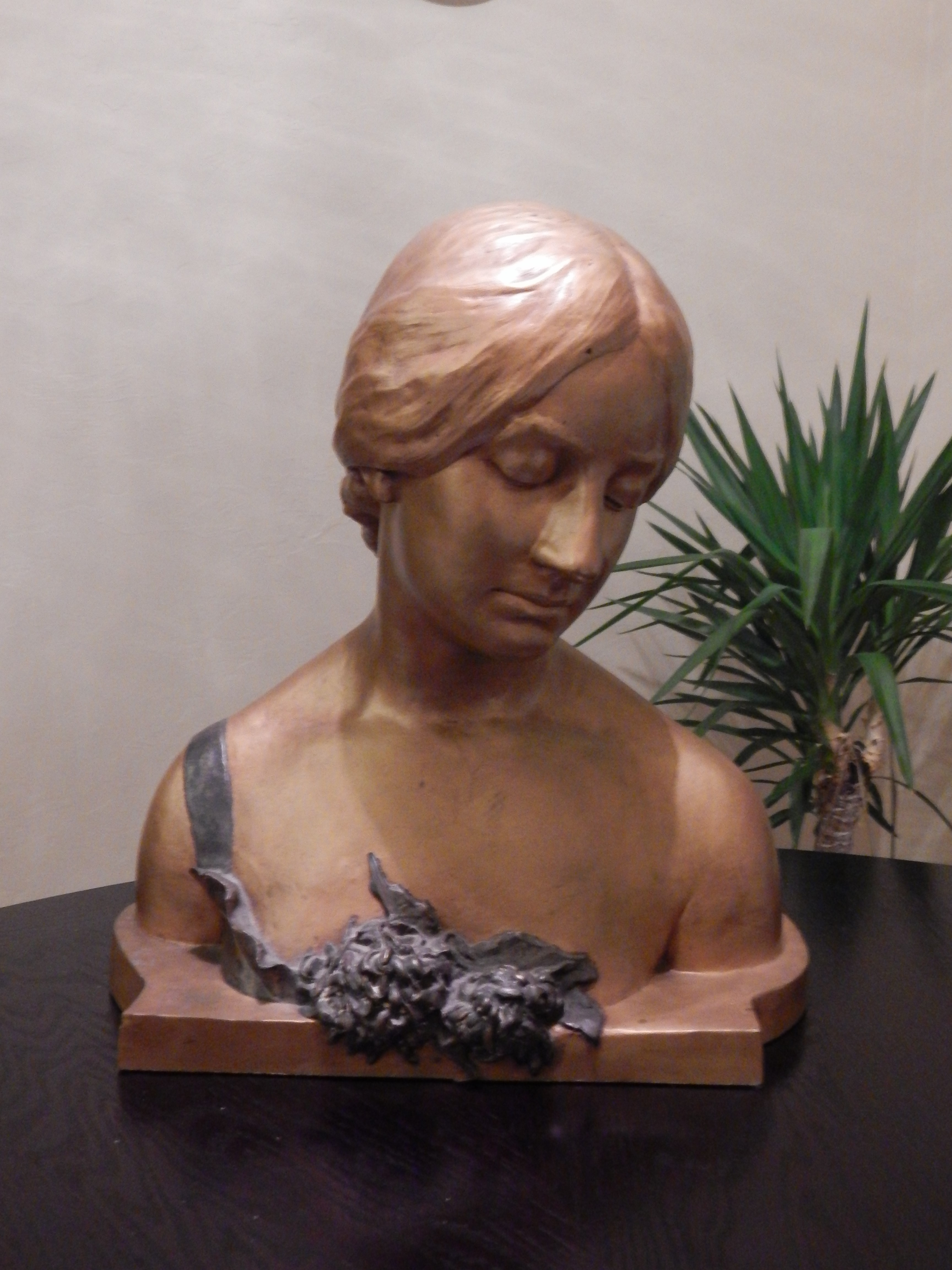
- A gilt bronze bust of a woman by Demagnez (cast by J. Malesset, fondeur, Paris, c. 1898)
- Born: 1869; Paris, France
- Died: 1925 (aged 55-56); Paris, France
- Education: École des Beaux-Arts (studied under Antonin Mercié)
- Known for: Sculpture
- Notable work: Source d'amour Saint-Chaptes War Memorial
- Movement: Art Nouveau

Marie-Antoinette Demagnez (1869–1925) was a French sculptor who worked during the late 19th century and early 20th century. Demagnez was a frequent exhibitor at the annual Salon art exhibition in Paris, and was one of only a few women whose works were juried into the show at that time in history.

She is best known for her stone statue called Source d'amour and her monumental war memorial statue at Saint-Chaptes that memorializes soldiers killed in both the First and Second World War.

Demagnez died in Paris in 1925.

== Early life and education ==
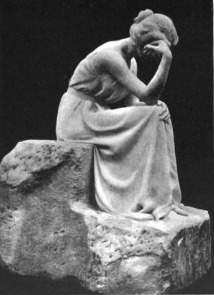
Mélancolie, a stone sculpture by Demagnez, c. 1895

Demagnez was born in Paris, France, in 1869. During a time in history when very few women ventured into the male-dominated world of bronze sculpture, Demagnez's work was deemed to be of such good quality that she broke the barrier and was allowed to exhibit her work in what was at the time arguably the world's most important art show—the annual Salon exhibition. She studied sculpture under the direction of Antonin Mercié at the École des Beaux-Arts in Paris.

== Career ==
Although perhaps best known for her World War I Memorial at Saint-Chaptes, she also produced a number of bust sculptures featuring prominent French citizens. Among these is a bronze bust of Léopold Bellan, cast by the A. A. Hébrard foundry, that she completed in 1911. Her circa 1895 stone sculpture entitled Mélancolie was described in 1902 by an art critic who said, "The work has delicate and thoroughly feminine sentiment, and is distinctly praiseworthy, albeit the execution shows marks of indecision and inexperience".

Demagnez won a bronze medal at the 1900 Exposition Universelle and also participated in the 1904 Louisiana Purchase Exposition (informally known as the St. Louis World's Fair) where she presented a stone statue called Poetry.

Demagnez completed an important World War I memorial in 1919 that is now located in Languedoc-Roussillon, Gard, Saint-Chaptes, France, in the Town Hall Square. It is made of stone, concrete and iron. It depicts a woman draped and crowned with laurel raising a palm with a soldier standing guard nearby.

Engraved on the bas-relief are the names of those soldiers from Saint-Chaptes that gave their lives for France in the First World War. The concrete portion was edited by Coignet of Paris. A plaque indicating the dead from this town in the Second World War was added sometime after that war ended in 1945.

== Death ==
Demagnez died in Paris in 1925.

== List of Works ==
Image	Title	Year	Type	Material	Notes	Location
	Bust of M. Wagner	1892	Bust	Plaster		Salon du 1892, Palais de l'Industrie
	Monsieur le comte H. de la R.	1893	Bust	Marble		Salon du 1893, Palais de l'Industrie
	Monsieur le comte J. de la B.	1895	Bust	Bronze		Salon du 1895, Palais de l'Industrie
Poesie	Poesie	1897	Statue	Stone	Receives an honorable mention at the Salon du 1907. Wins a bronze medal at l'Exposition décennale des beaux arts during the 1900 Exposition Universelle Paris.	Salon du 1897, Galerie des machines. 1899-1900 l'Exposition décennale des beaux arts, Grand Palais 1904 Louisiana Purchase Exposition, St. Louis, USA
	Étude de Tète	1898				Salon du 1898, Galerie des machines
La fortune et le jeune enfant	La fortune et le jeune enfant	1901				Salon du 1901, Grand Palais
La Source D'Amour	La Source d'amour	1902	Deep relief		Art critic Yvanhoe Rambosson describes the piece as a charming sculpture group containing a young nymph putting her hands up to the spring and drinking from it.	Salon du 1902, Grand Palais Salon du 1903, Grand Palais
	L'Aveu	1903				Salon du 1903, Grand Palais
	Le Pardon	1905	Sculpture group	Stone		Salon du 1905, Grand Palais
	Souvenir	1906	Bust	Plaster		Salon du 1906, Grand Palais
	Jeunesse	1907	Garden planter	Bronze		Salon du 1907, Grand Palais
	Portrait of M. Bellan	1907	Bas-relief	Bronze		Salon du 1907, Grand Palais Salon du 1912, Grand Palais
	Harmonie	1908				Salon du 1908, Grand Palais
	Portrait of M. Cheramy	1910	Bust	Bronze		Salon du 1910, Grand Palais
	Le Souvenir	1914	Statue	Plaster	Figure forming part of a monument	Salon du 1914, Grand Palais
	La Marne	1921	Sculpture group	Plaster	references the 1914 sculpture Le Souvenir	Salon du 1921, Grand Palais
	Portrait de Madame la Duchesse de La R.	1922	Bust	Plaster		Salon du 1922, Grand Palais
	Pomone, reine des Vergers	1923	Decorative statue	Stone		Salon du 1923, Grand Palais

== Signature example ==
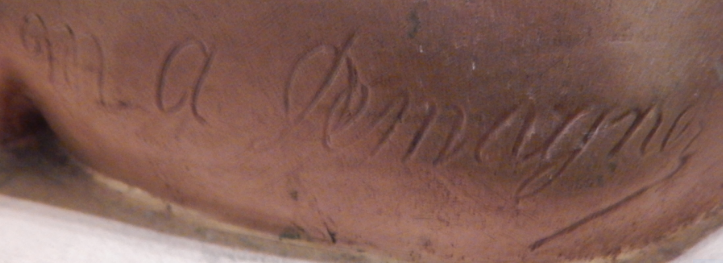
A circa 1898 signature example for M. A. Demagnez
