= Francis Scott Key Monument =

Monument by Antonin Mercié in Bolton Hill, Baltimore, Maryland, U.S.

Coordinates: 39.30388°N 76.62605°W

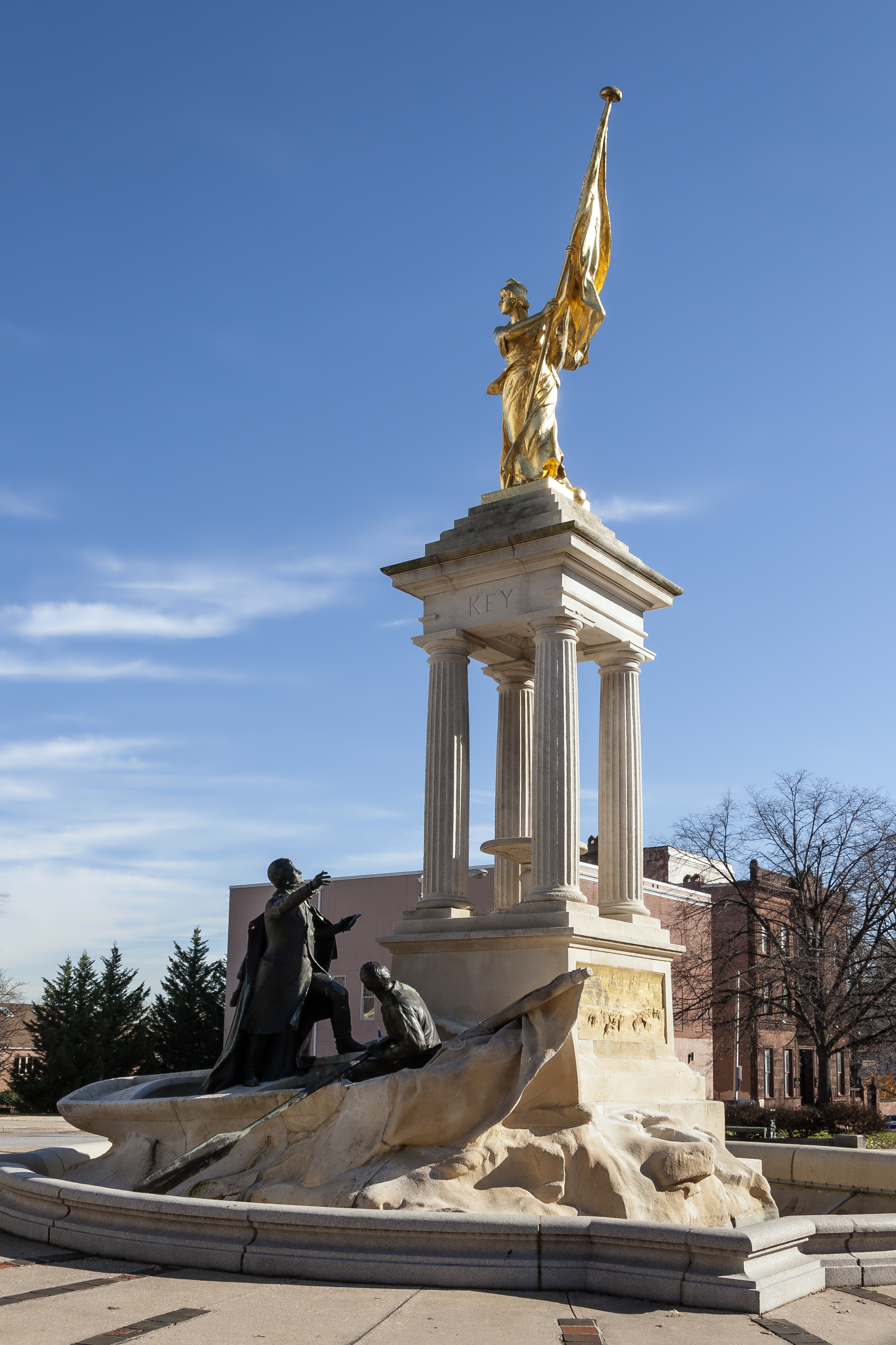
- The monument in 2011
- Location: Eutaw Place, Baltimore, Maryland, United States
- Designer: Antonin Mercié
- Material: Marble, gold leaf
- Completion date: 1911
- Dedicated date: 1911
- Dedicated to: Francis Scott Key

The Francis Scott Key Monument is a monument to the author of the text of the American national anthem "The Star-Spangled Banner", in the Bolton Hill neighborhood of Baltimore, Maryland, United States. The monument features a gilded statue of Lady Columbia waving a flag on a pedestal of four stone columns, surrounded on two sides by gilded reliefs depicting the Battle of Baltimore. At the pedestal's base is a bronze statue of Francis Scott Key standing in a rowboat carved from stone.

== History ==
Charles Marburg gave $25,000 to his brother Theodore Marburg to hire a sculptor to create a monument to Francis Scott Key. The French sculptor Antonin Mercié was selected. Mercié had previously created a bronze equestrian statue of Robert E. Lee in 1890 in Richmond, Virginia. The Francis Scott Key Monument was dedicated on Eutaw Place in 1911.

It was restored and rededicated on September 11, 1999.

The monument was defaced with the words "Racist Anthem" and splashed with red paint in September 2017. The city quickly restored the monument.

== Gallery ==
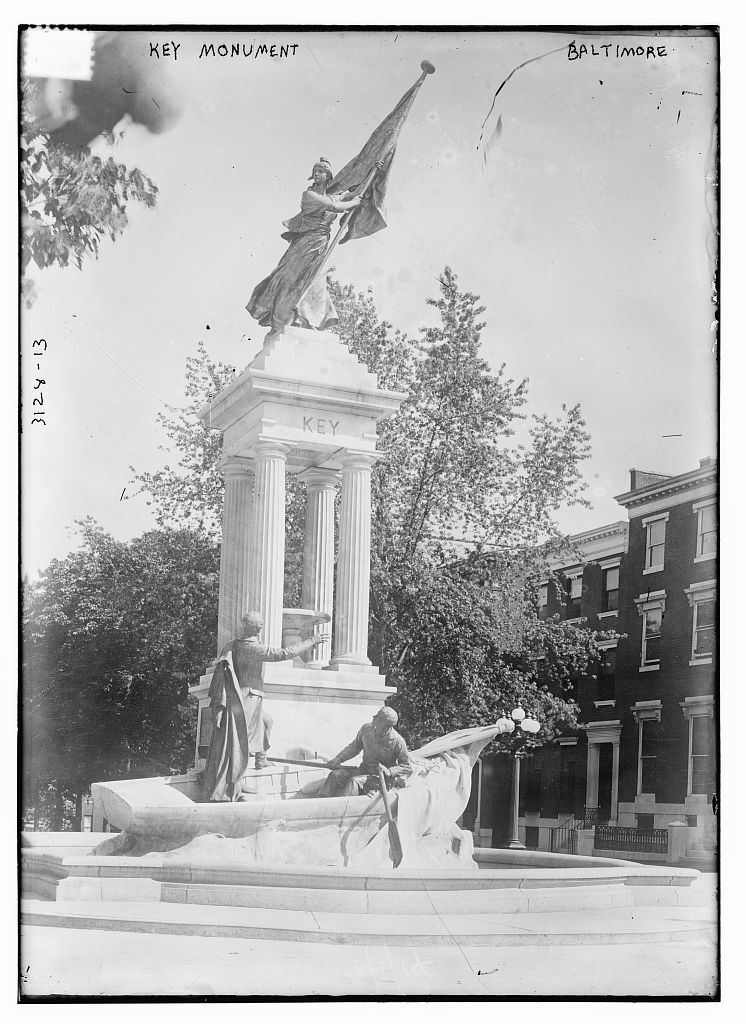
Monument circa 1910

Monument circa 1920

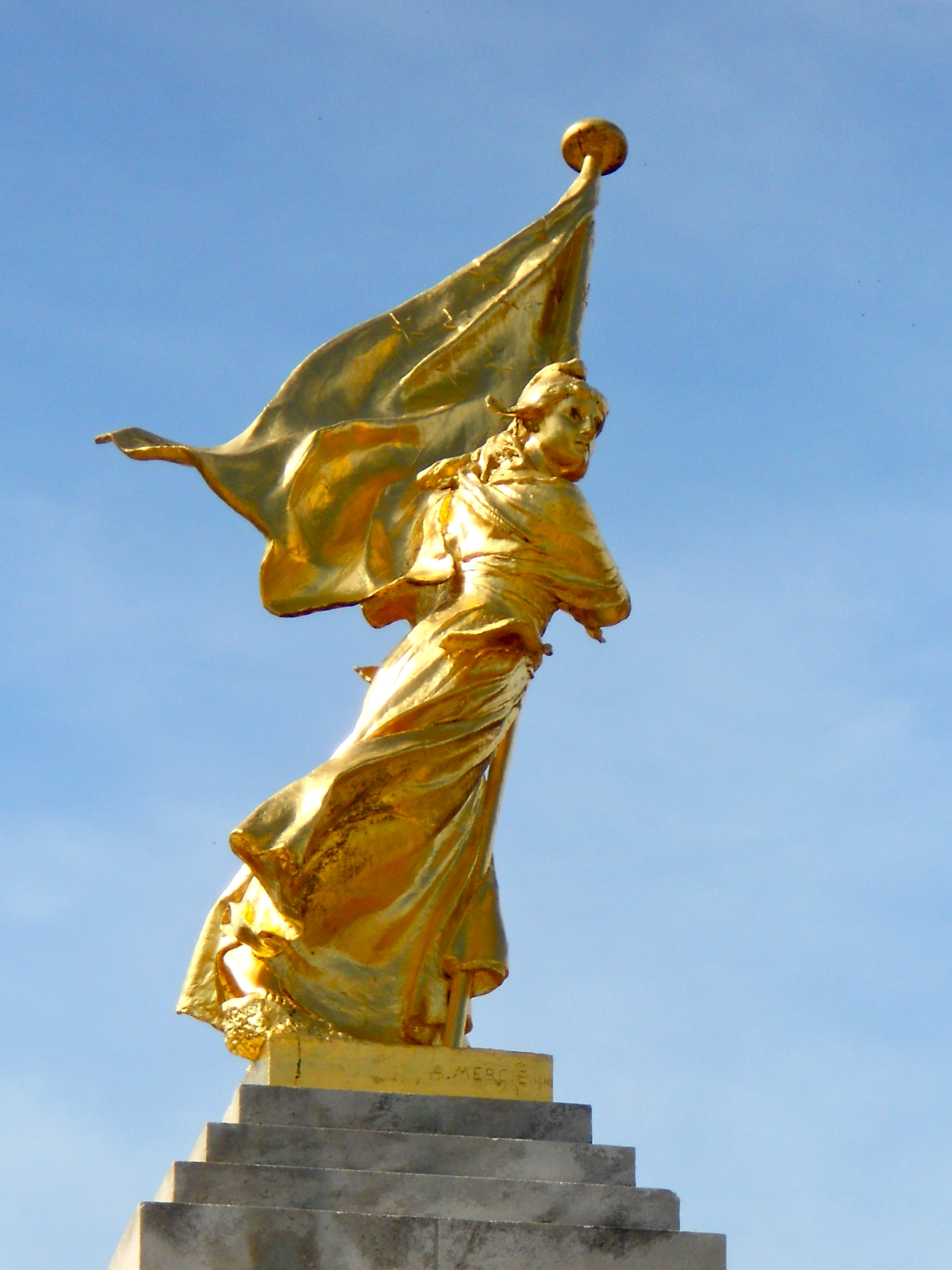
Figure of Columbia with the American Flag

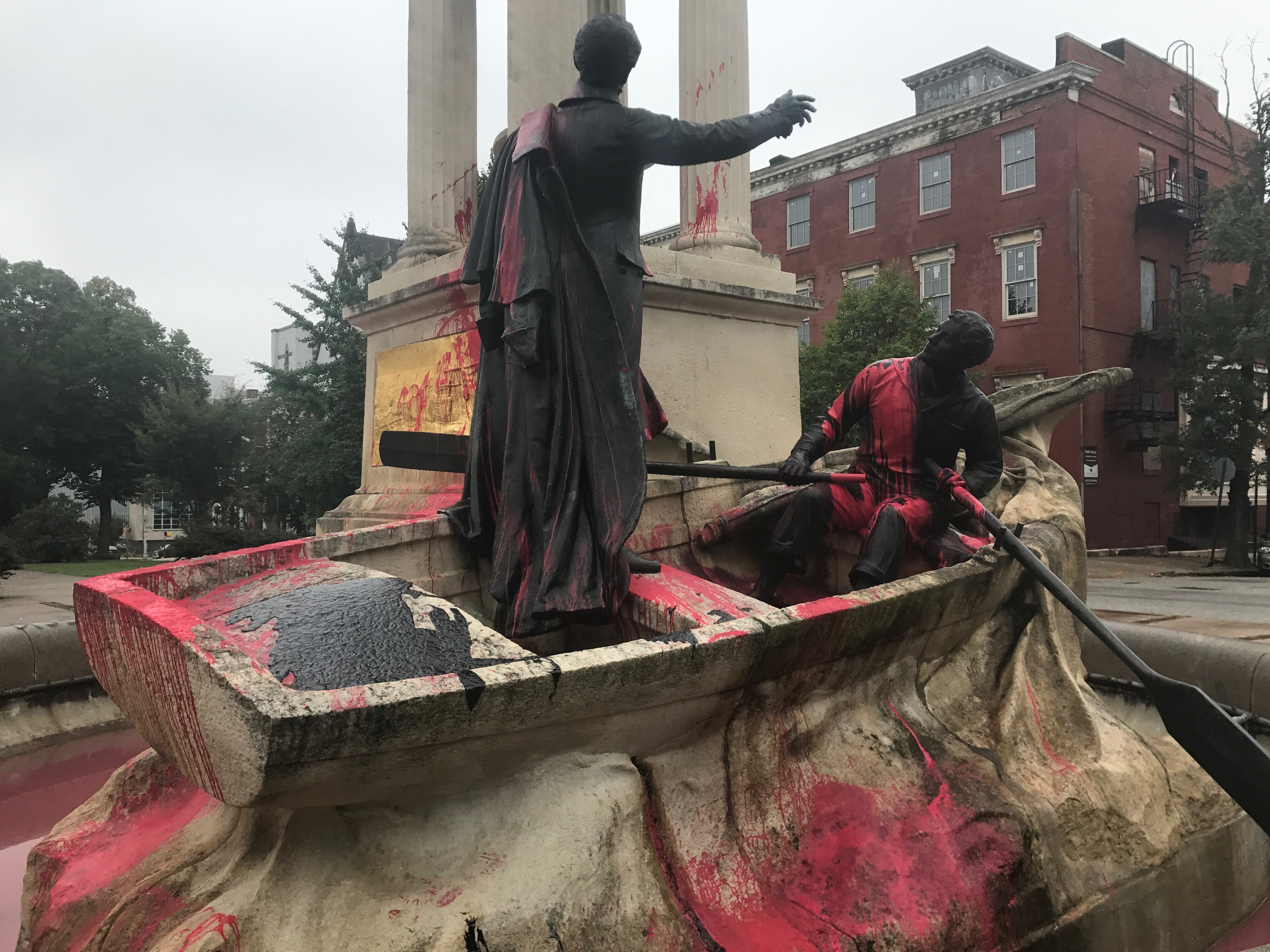
Monument defaced in 2017

== See also ==
- List of public art in Baltimore
- Orpheus with the Awkward Foot
- The works of Antonin Mercié
