= Antonin Mercié =

French sculptor and painter (1845–1916)

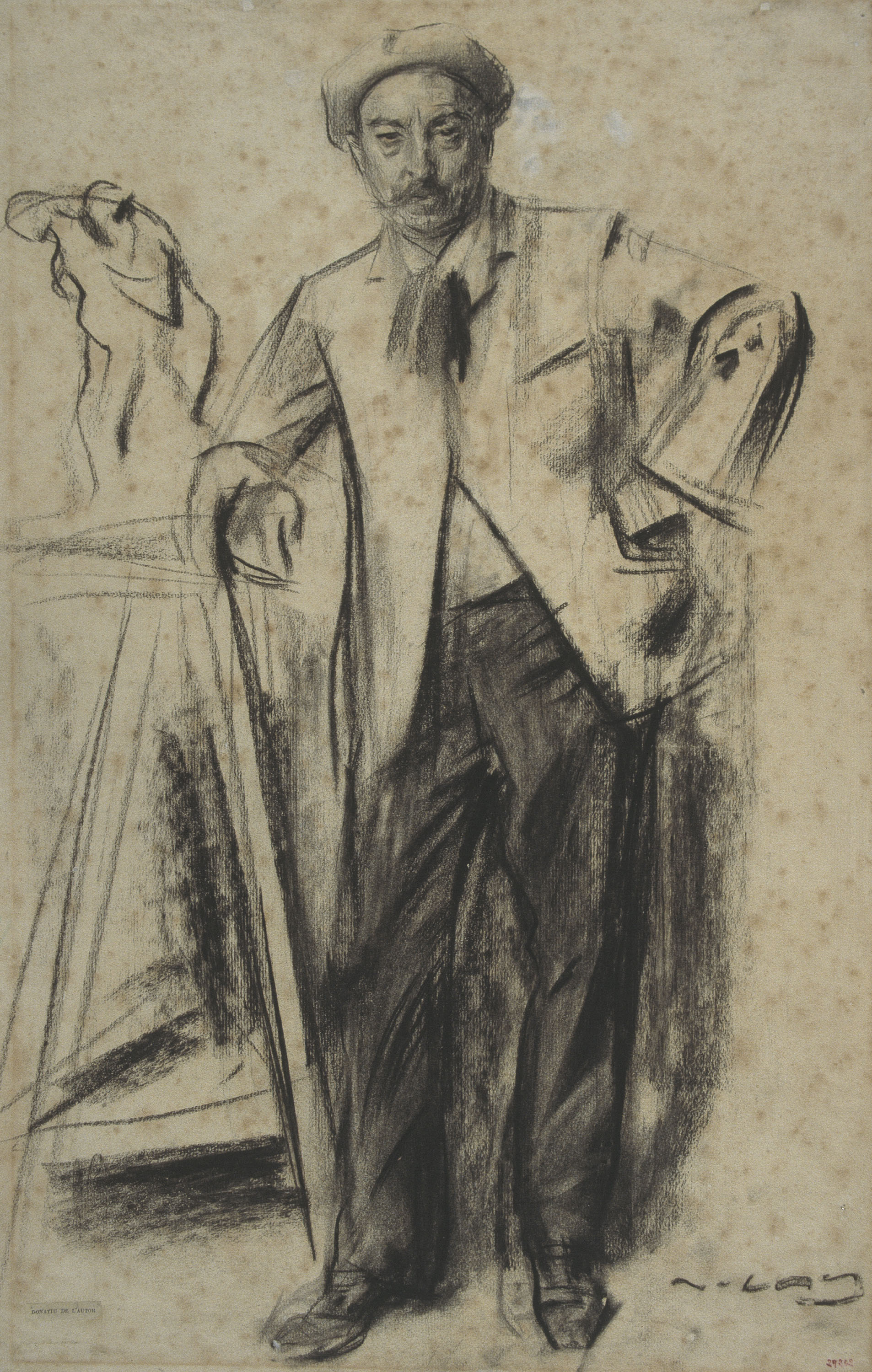
Antonin Mercié sketched by Ramon Casas (MNAC)

Marius Jean Antonin Mercié (October 30, 1845 in Toulouse – December 12, 1916 in Paris) was a French sculptor, medallist and painter.

== Biography ==
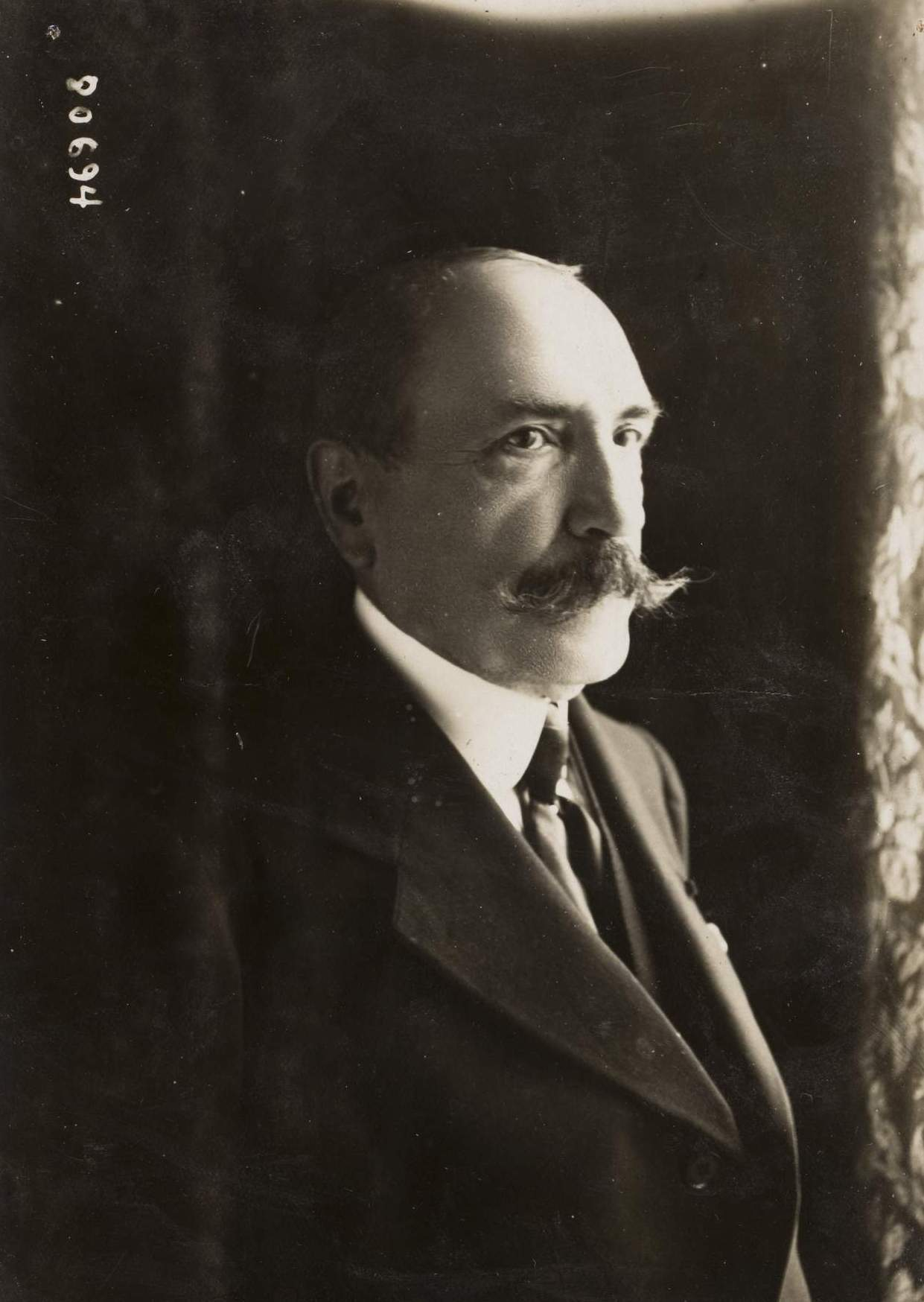
Antonin Mercié in 1916

Mercié entered the École des Beaux-Arts, Paris, and studied under Alexandre Falguière and François Jouffroy, and in 1868 gained the Grand Prix de Rome at age 23. His first great popular successes were the David and Gloria Victis. The latter bronze was shown and received the Medal of Honour of the Paris Salon and was subsequently placed in the Square Montholon.

The bronze David was one of his most popular works. The Biblical hero is depicted naked with the head of Goliath at his feet like Donatello's David, but with a turbanned head and sheathing his long sword. Numerous reproductions exist, most of which incorporate a loincloth that covers David's genitalia but not his buttocks. The lifesize original is now in the Musée d'Orsay.

Mercié was appointed Professor of Drawing and Sculpture at the École des Beaux-Arts, and was elected a member of the Académie française in 1891, after being awarded the biennial prize of the Institute of 800 in 1887. He was subsequently elected to grand officier of the Légion d'honneur, and in 1913 became the president of the Société des artistes français. Marie-Antoinette Demagnez was among his many students at the École des Beaux-Arts. He died in Paris on December 12, 1916.

== Works ==
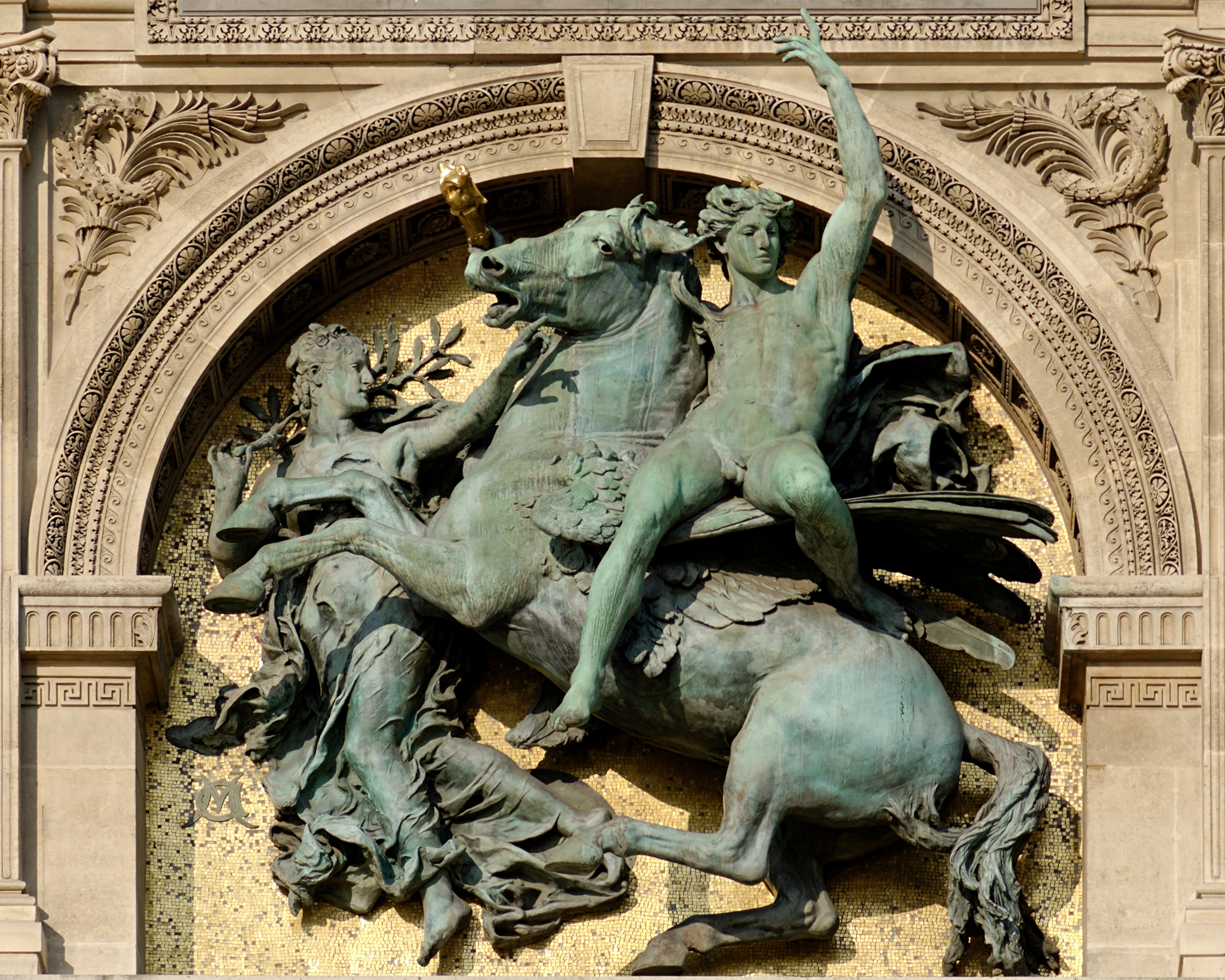
Genius of Arts, Louvre, Paris

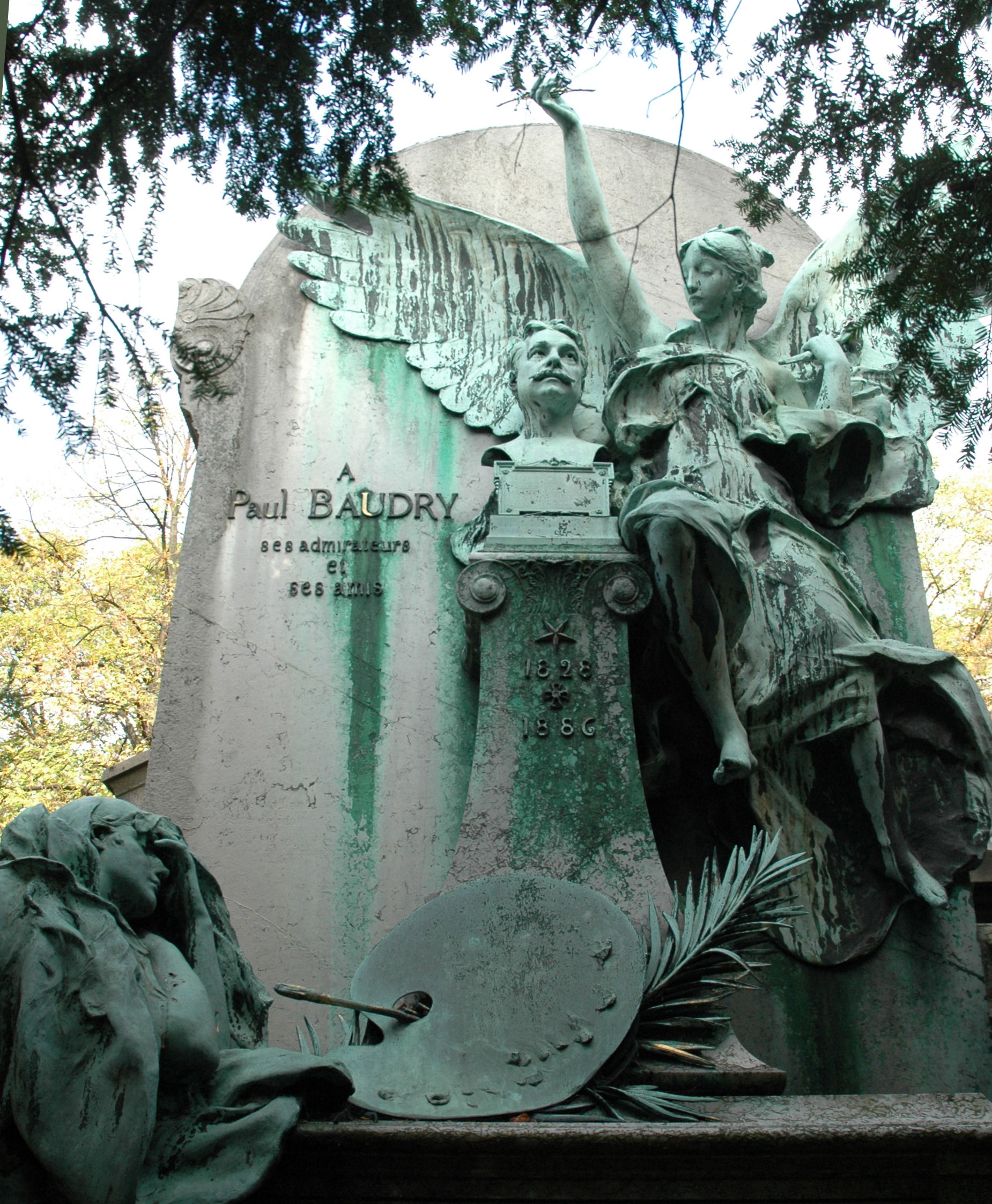
Monument to Paul Baudry, Père Lachaise Cemetery, Paris

The Genius of the Arts (1877), a relief, is in the Tuileries, in substitution for Antoine-Louis Barye's Napoleon III. A similar work for the tomb of Jules Michelet (1879; designed with architect Jean-Louis Pascal) is in Père Lachaise Cemetery, and in the same year Mercié produced the statue of Arago with accompanying reliefs, now erected at Perpignan.

In 1882, Mercié repeated his great patriotic success of 1874 with a group Quand Même!, replicas of which have been set up at Belfort and in the garden of the Tuileries. Le Souvenir (1885), a marble statue for the tomb of Charles Ferry, was called one of his most beautiful works by the 1911 Encyclopædia Britannica. Regret, for the tomb of Alexandre Cabanel, was produced in 1892, along with William Tell, subsequently at Lausanne.

Mercié also designed the monuments to Jean-Louis-Ernest Meissonier (1895), erected in the Jardin de l'Infante in the Louvre, and Louis Faidherbe (1896) at Lille, a statue of Adolphe Thiers set up at St Germain-en-Laye, the monument to Paul Baudry at Père Lachaise, and that of Louis-Philippe and Queen Amélie for their tomb at Dreux. His stone group of Justice is at the Hôtel de Ville, Paris.

Numerous other statues, portrait busts, and medallions came from the sculptor's hand, which gained Mercié a medal of honor at the Paris Exhibition (1878) and the grand prix at that of 1889. Among the paintings exhibited by the artist are a Venus, to which was awarded a medal in 1883, Leda (1884), and Michelangelo studying Anatomy (1885), his most dramatic work in this medium.

Mercié is known in the United States for three monuments: the 1890 Robert E. Lee equestrian bronze on Monument Avenue in Richmond, Virginia (the Robert E. Lee Monument), which was removed in September 2021; his 1891 collaboration with former teacher Alexandre Falguière on the statue of the Marquis de Lafayette in Lafayette Square, Washington, D.C.; and the 1911 Francis Scott Key Monument in Baltimore, Maryland.

== Gallery ==
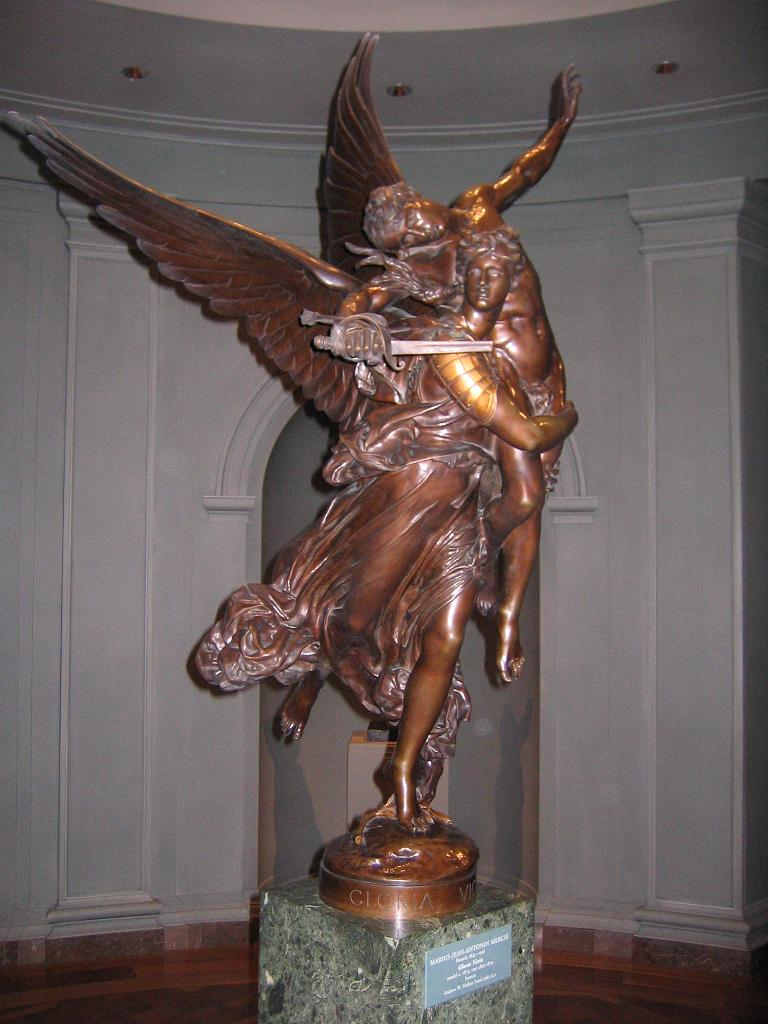
Gloria Victis

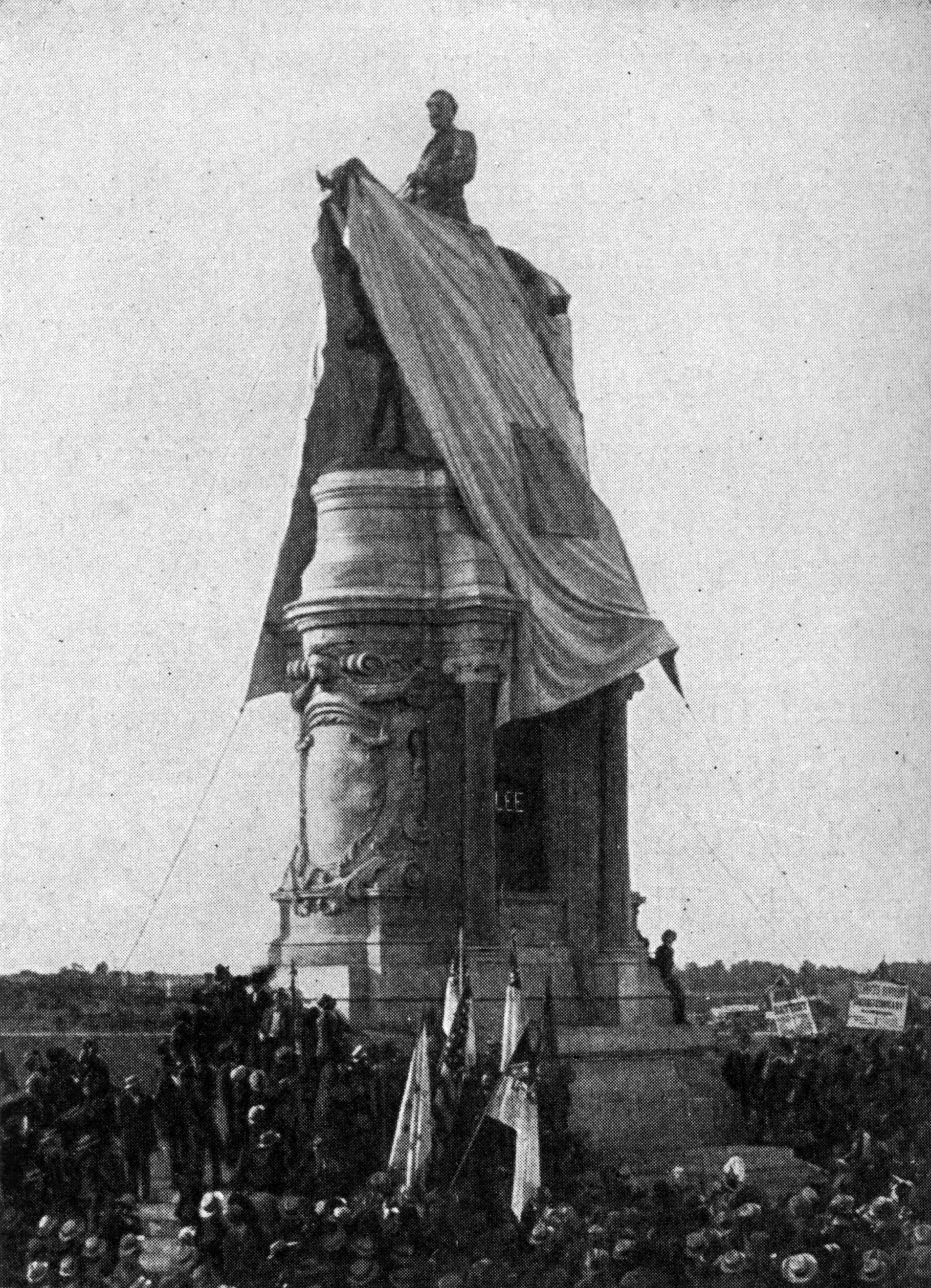
Unveiling of the Equestrian Statue of Robert E. Lee, May 29, 1890. Richmond, Virginia

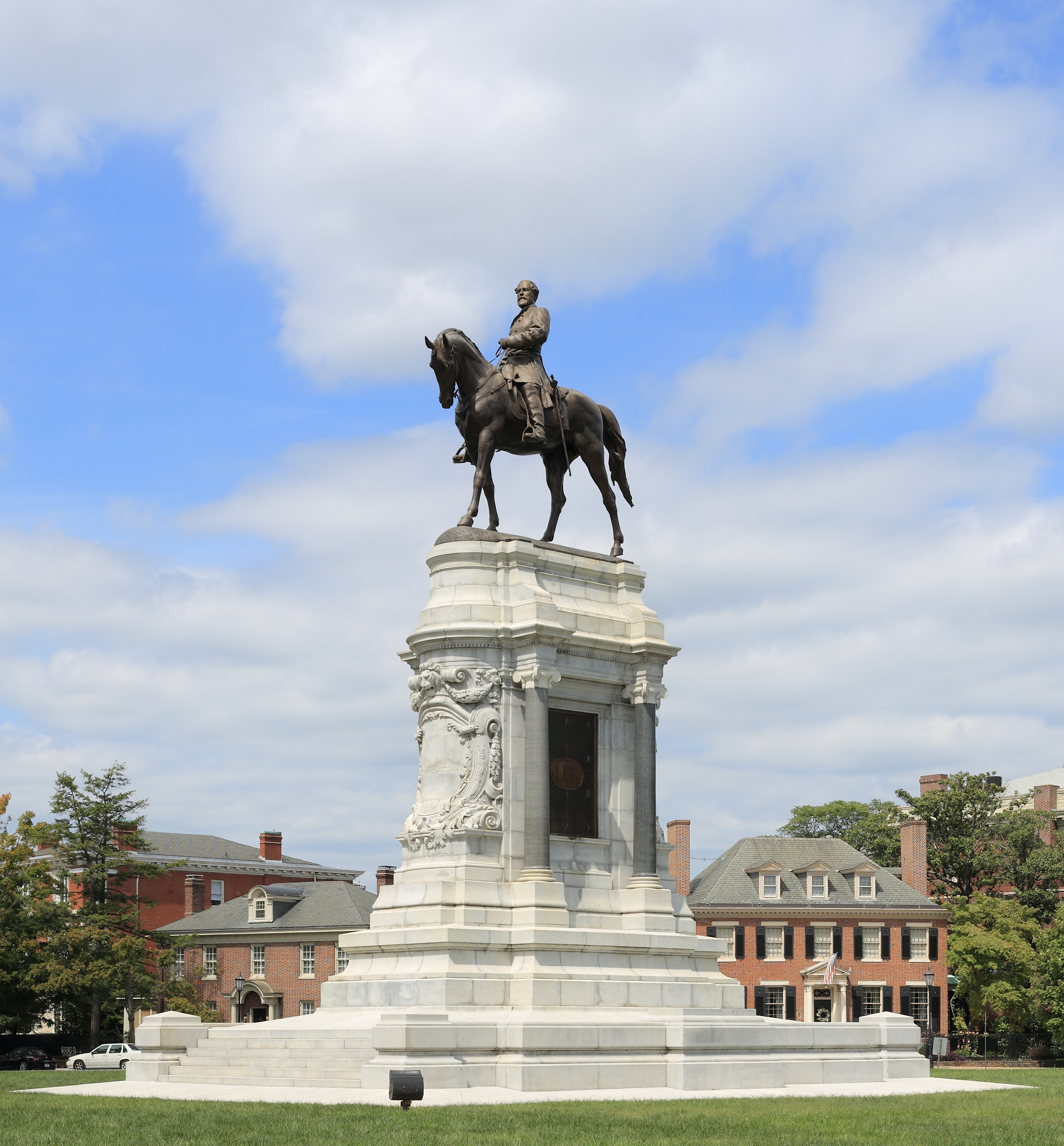
Lee statue, unveiled

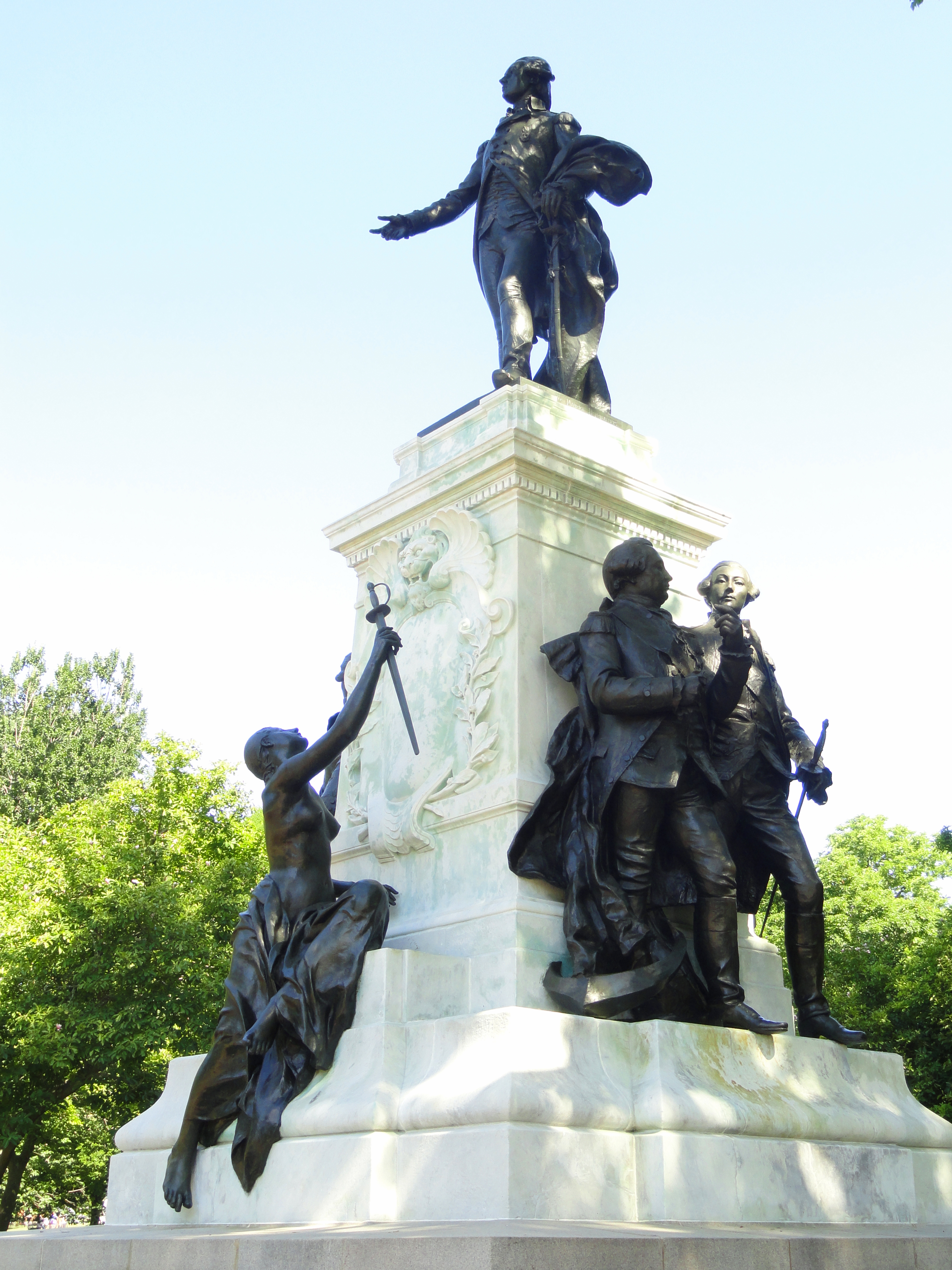
Statue of the Marquis de Lafayette, Lafayette Square, Washington, D.C., 1891

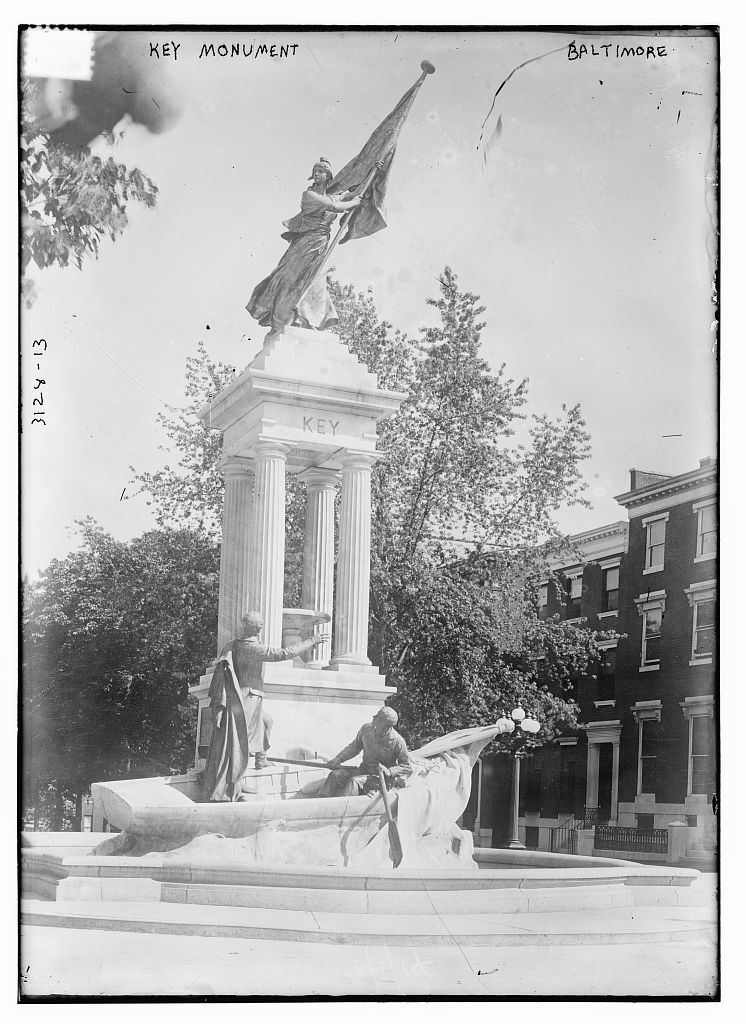
Francis Scott Key Monument, circa 1907–1910

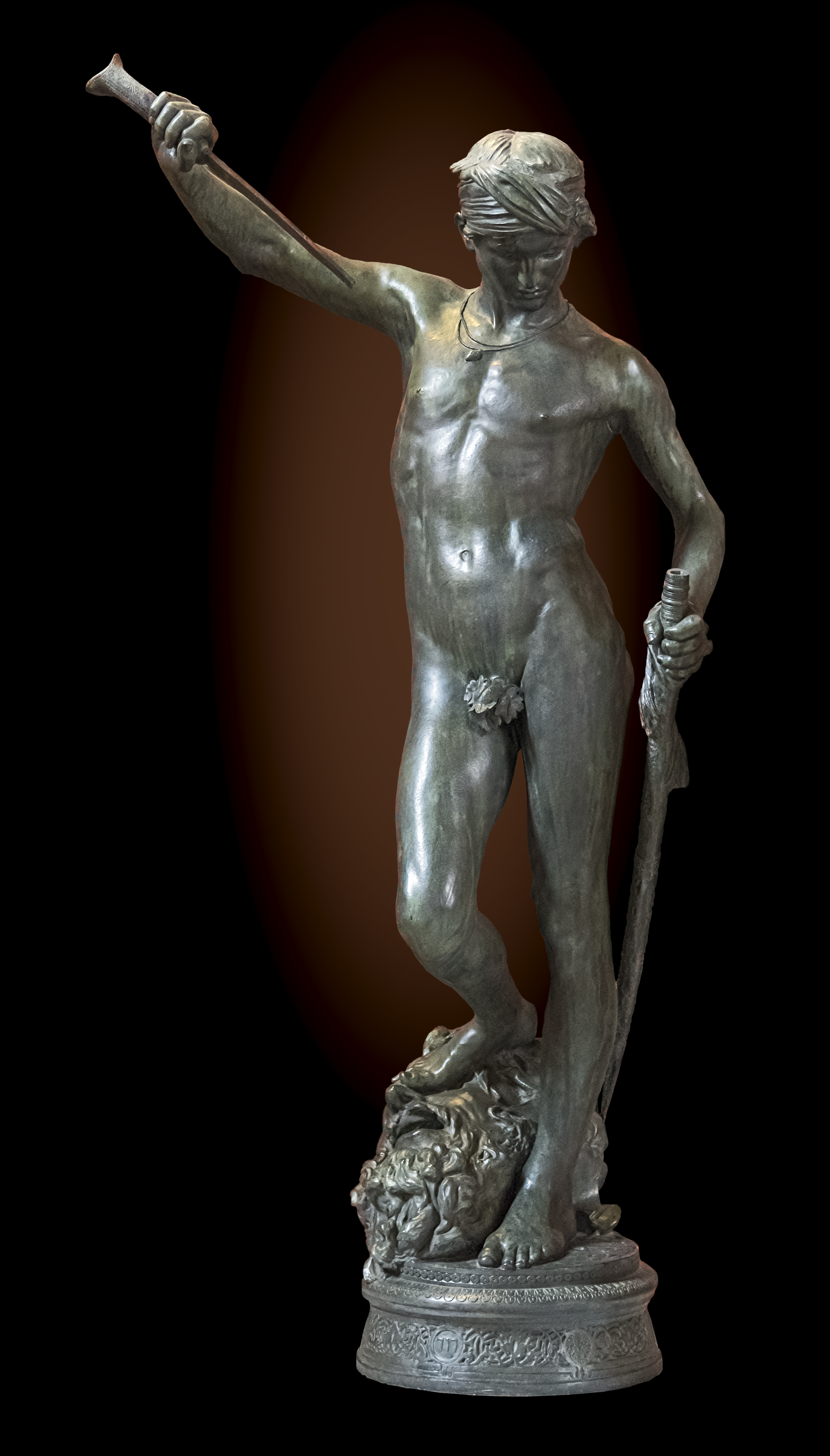
David, 1870

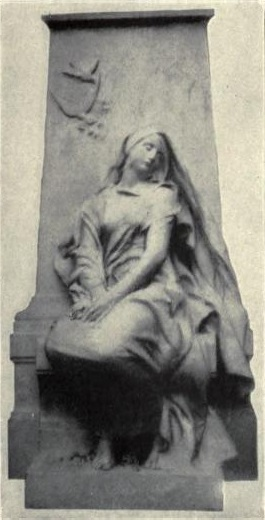
Le Souvenir, 1885, for the tomb of Mme Charles Ferry

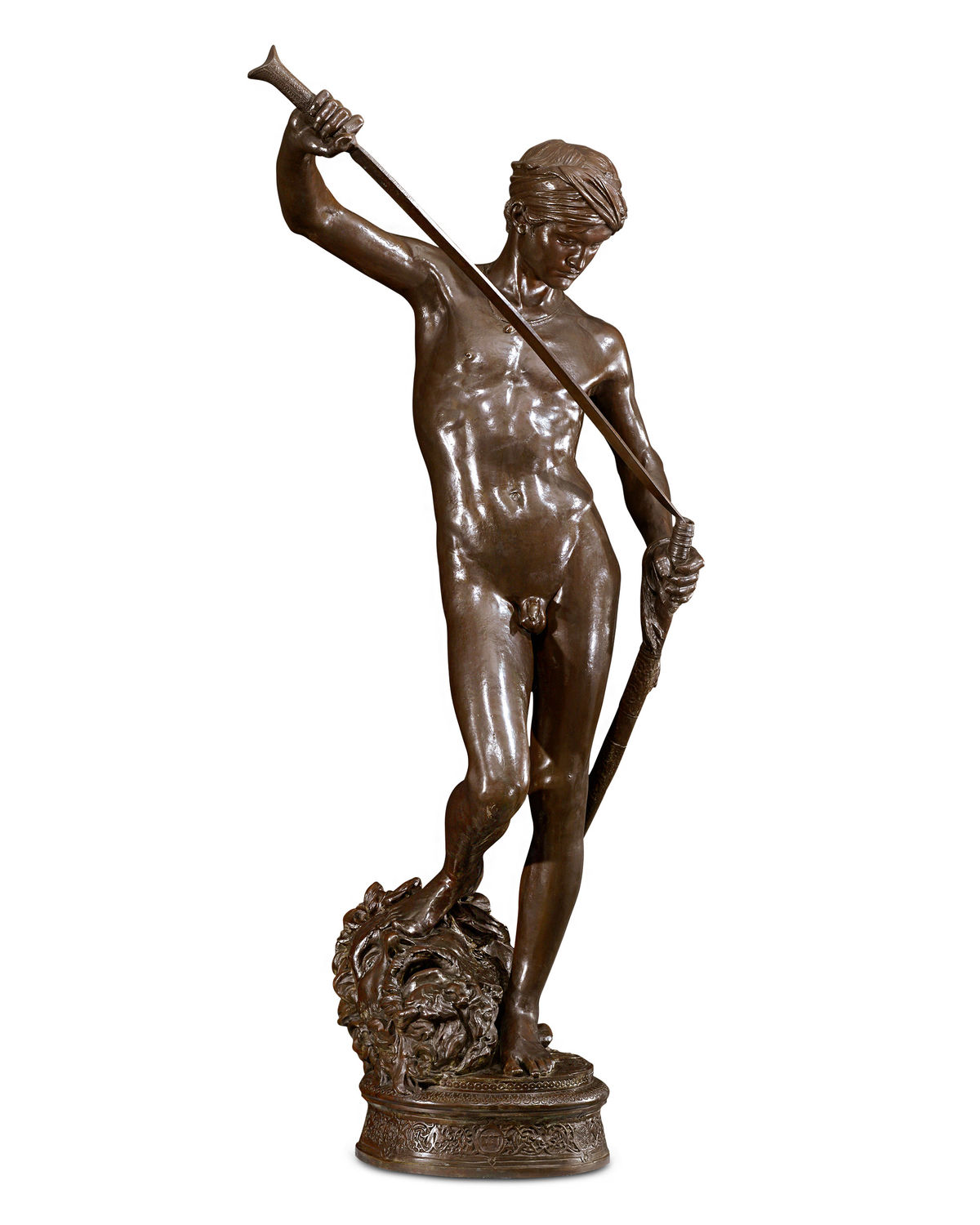
David vainqueur de Goliath, circa 1894-1910

== See also ==
- List of works by Antonin Mercié
