= Eutaw Street =

Major street in Baltimore, Maryland

Eutaw Street, Eutaw Place
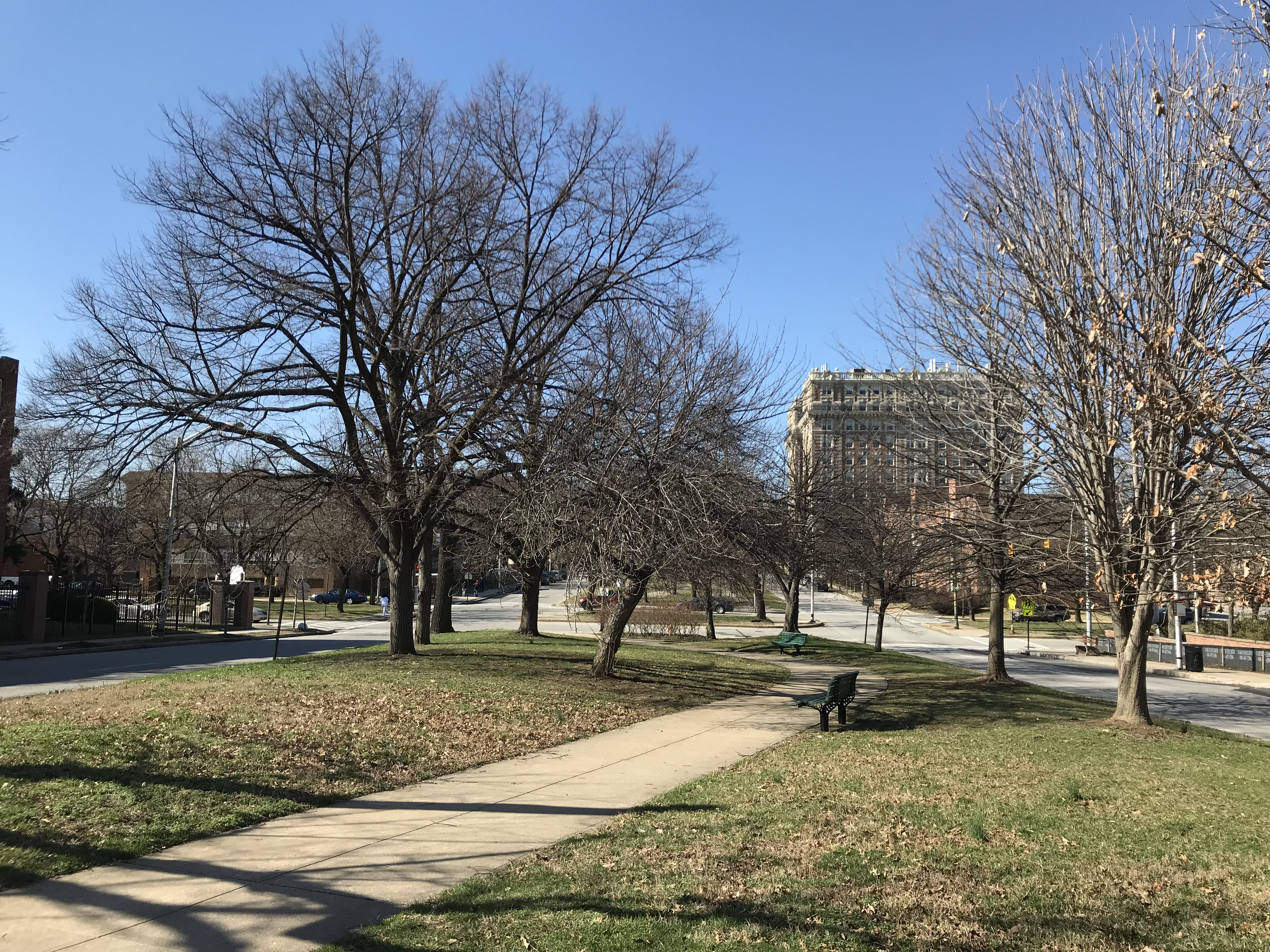
- Eutaw Place park median
- Interactive map of Eutaw Street, Eutaw Place
- Former name: Gibson Street
- Length: 2.4 mi (3.9 km)
- Location: Baltimore
- Postal code: 21201, 21217
- Coordinates: 39°17′21.54″N 76°37′15.35″W

Eutaw Street is a major street in Baltimore, Maryland, mostly within the downtown area. Outside of downtown, it is mostly known as Eutaw Place.

The south end of Eutaw Street is at Oriole Park at Camden Yards. After this point, the street continues as a pedestrian walkway inside the stadium. A sign above this entrance is marked "Eutaw Street."

Eutaw Street is famously known as the location of Lexington Market.

The north end of Eutaw Street is at Dolphin Street. The street continues past this point under the name Eutaw Place through the communities of Bolton Hill and Reservoir Hill, and ends at Druid Park Lake Drive. Eutaw Street is prefixed with North or South depending on whether it is north or south of Baltimore Street. Eutaw Place does not have such a directional designation.

Eutaw Place was called Gibson Street until 1853. This area was known as a home to the wealthy, particularly the affluent German-Jewish community of Baltimore.

The Baltimore Metro Subway runs below a large part of Eutaw Street. Two of its stations, State Center and Lexington Market, are located along Eutaw Street.

== Landmarks ==
Some major city landmarks are located on or near Eutaw Street. These include:

- Emerson Bromo-Seltzer Tower
- Eutaw Place Temple
- Francis Scott Key Monument
- Hippodrome Theater
- Lexington Market
- Lillie Mae Carroll Jackson Museum
- Maryland General Hospital
- Oriole Park at Camden Yards
- University of Maryland at Baltimore

== Gallery ==
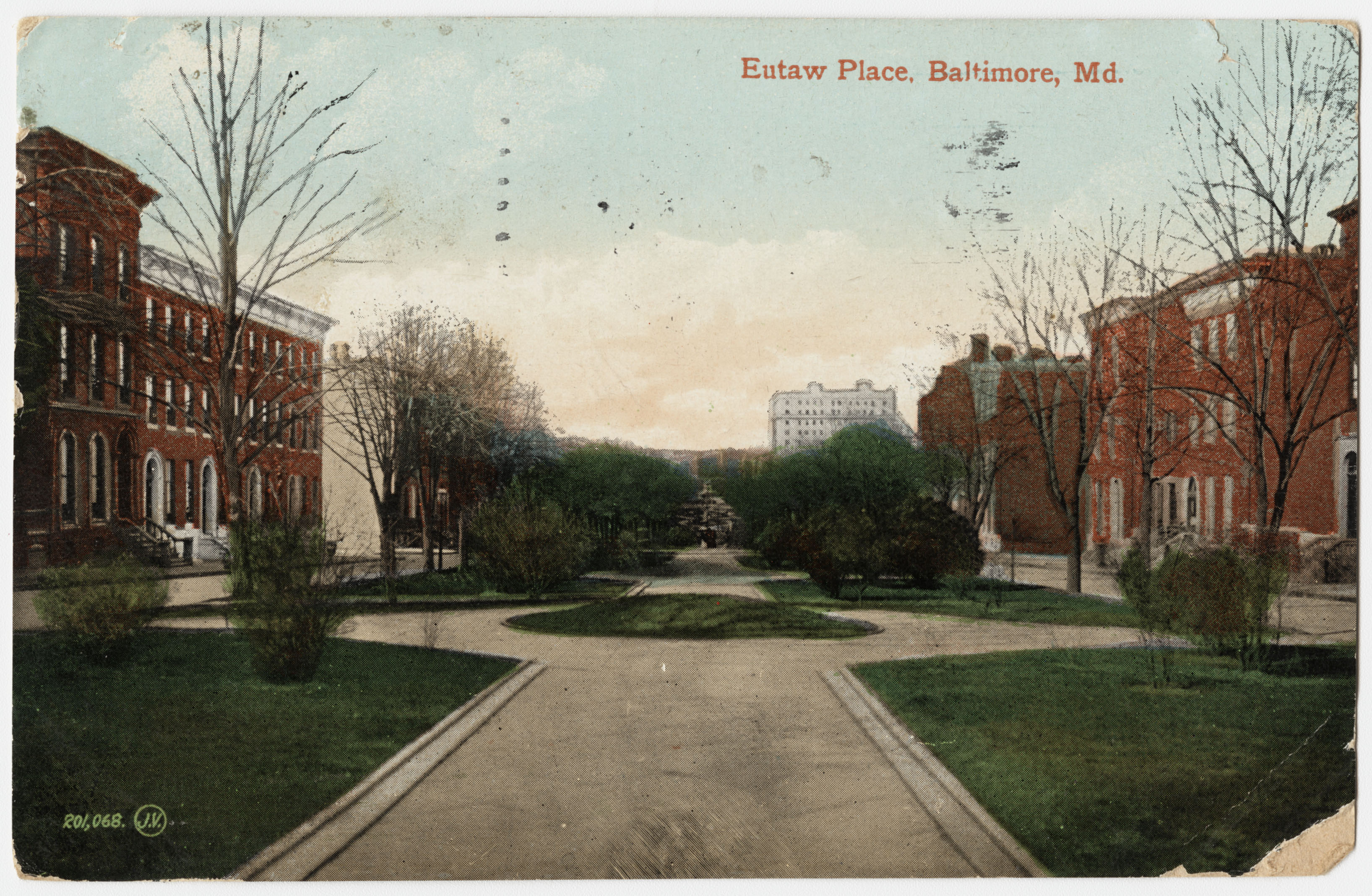
Eutaw Place circa 1907

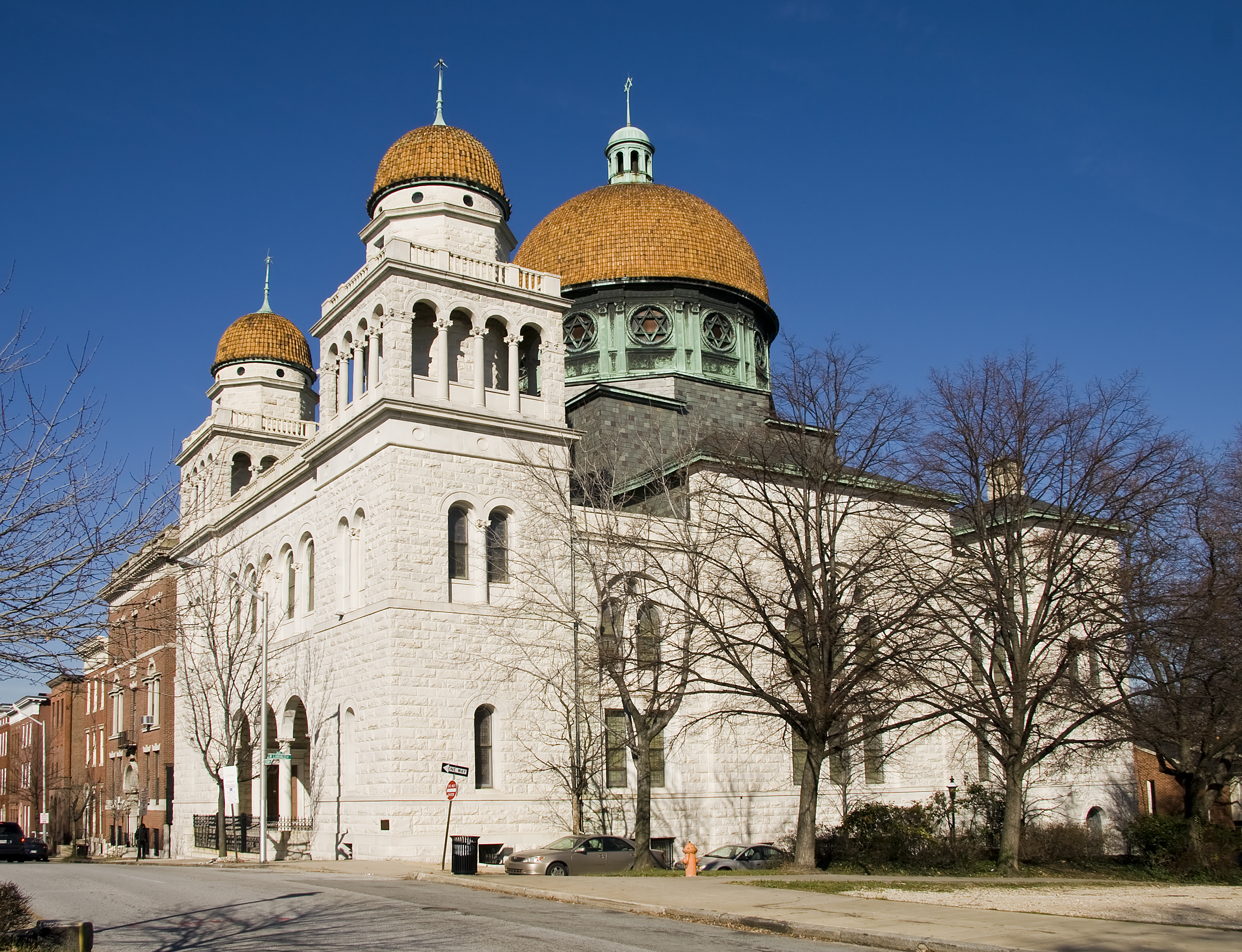
Eutaw Place Temple

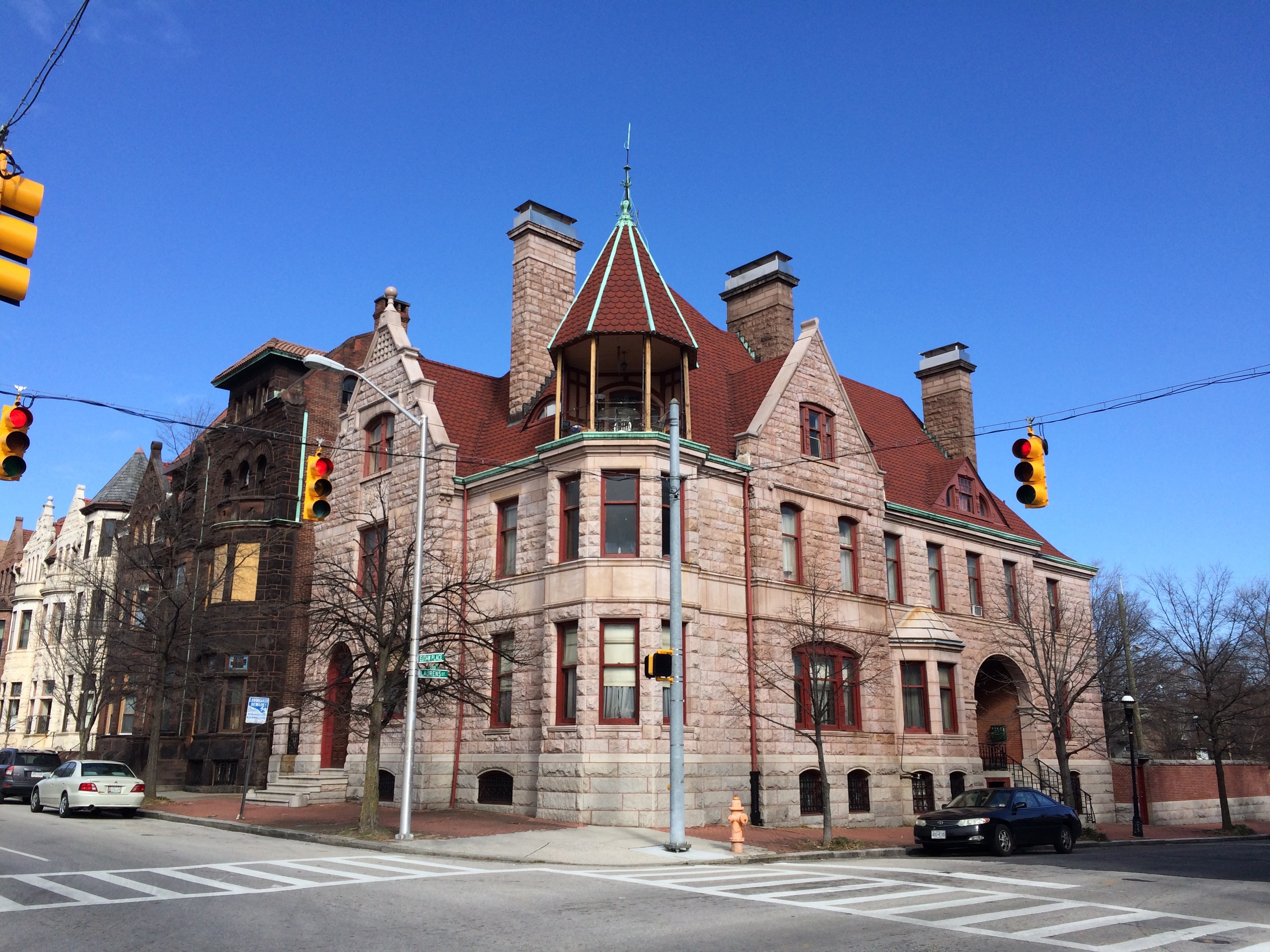
Eutaw Place and Laurens Street

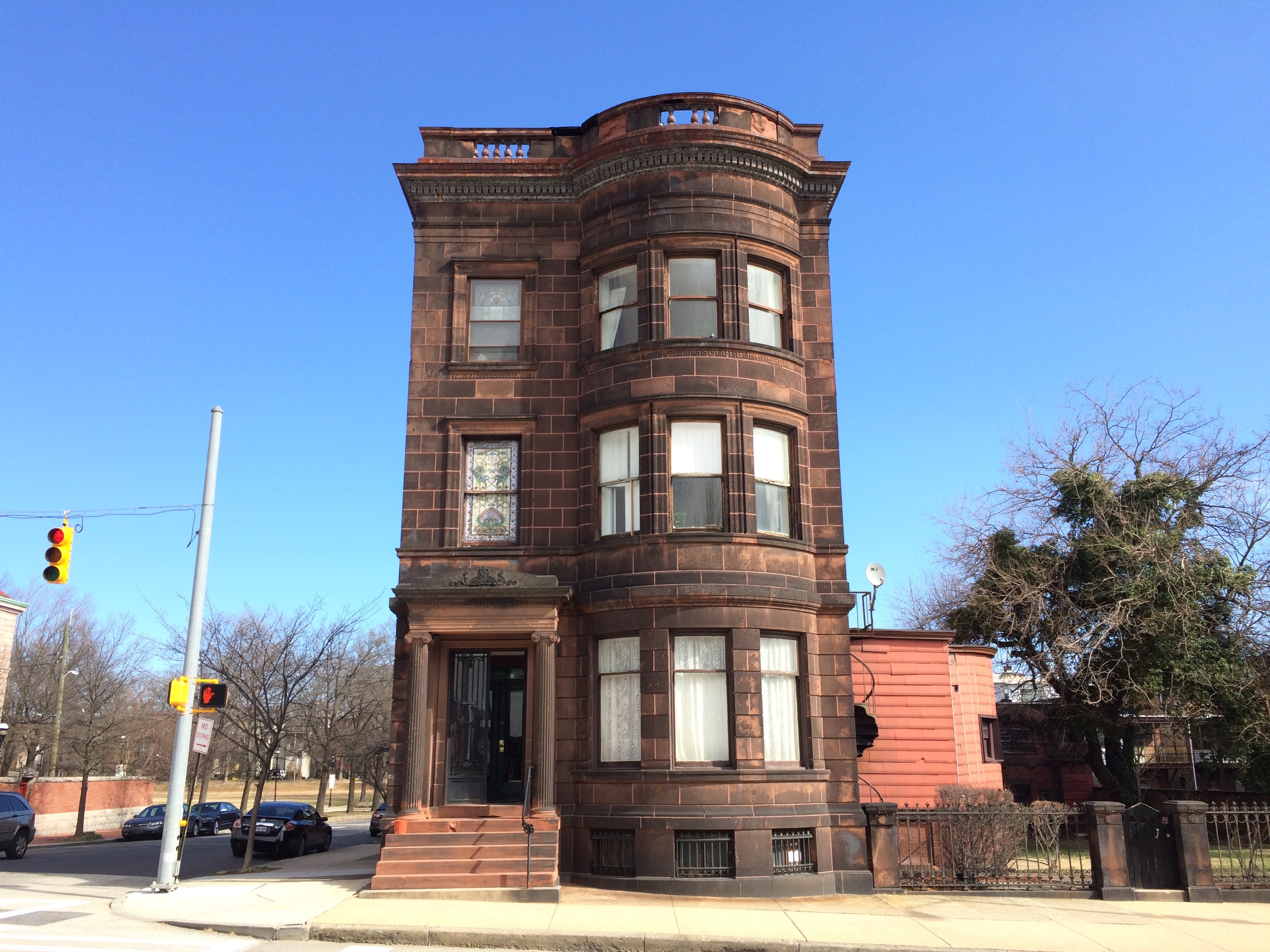
Brownstone on Eutaw Place at Dolphin Street

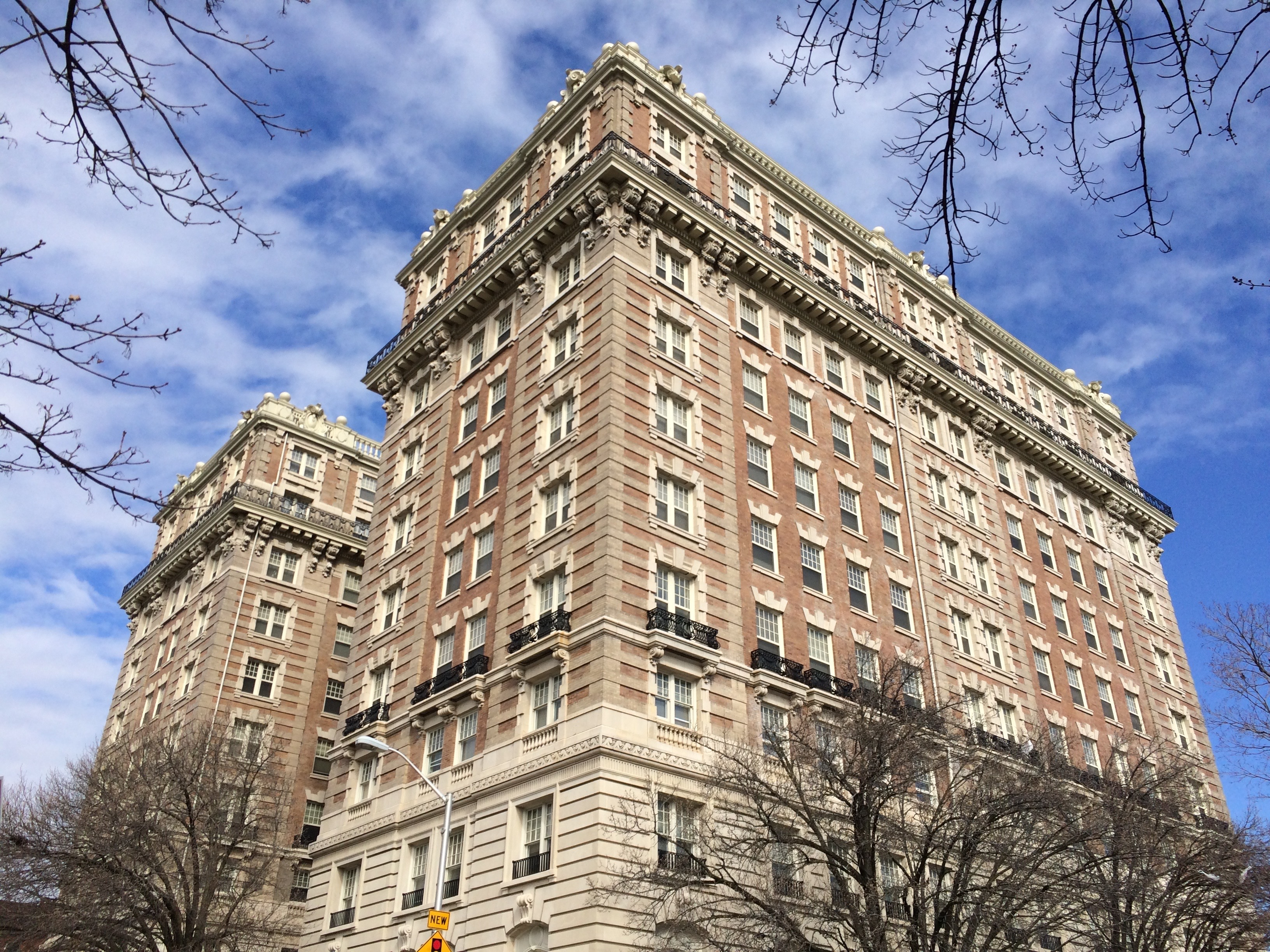
Marlborough Apartment Building

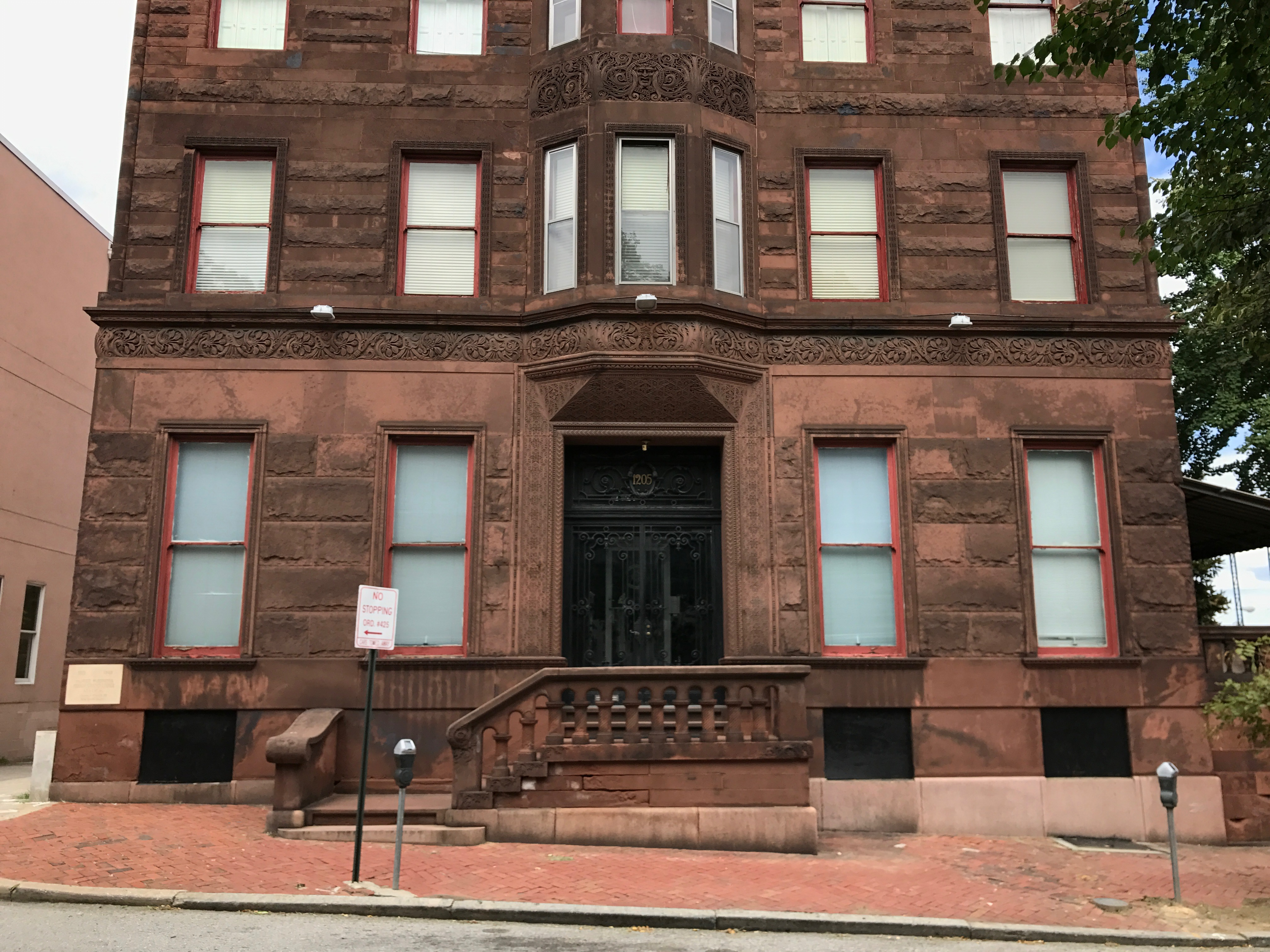
Grand Lodge, 1205 Eutaw Place

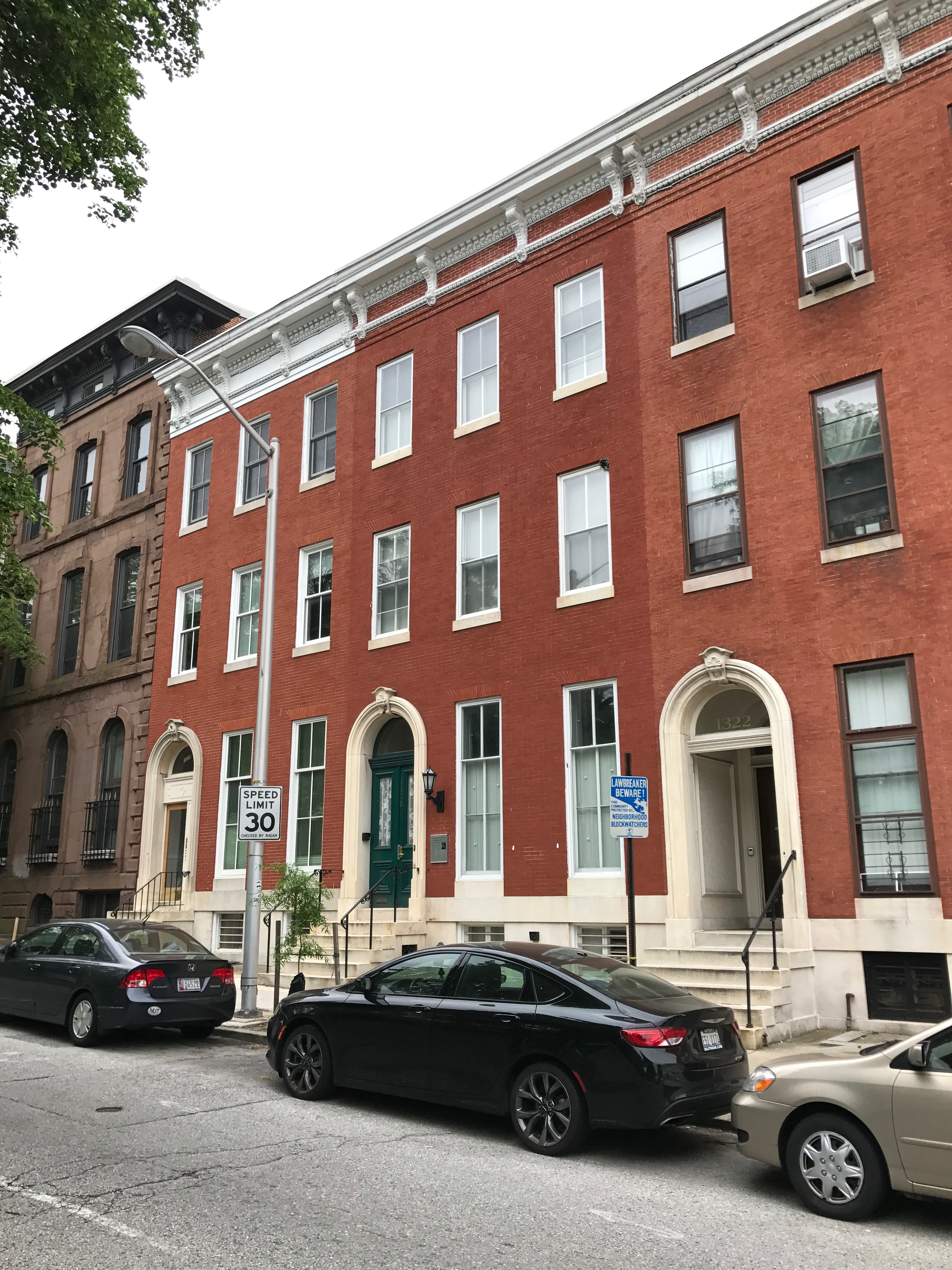
Lillie Mae Carroll Jackson Museum

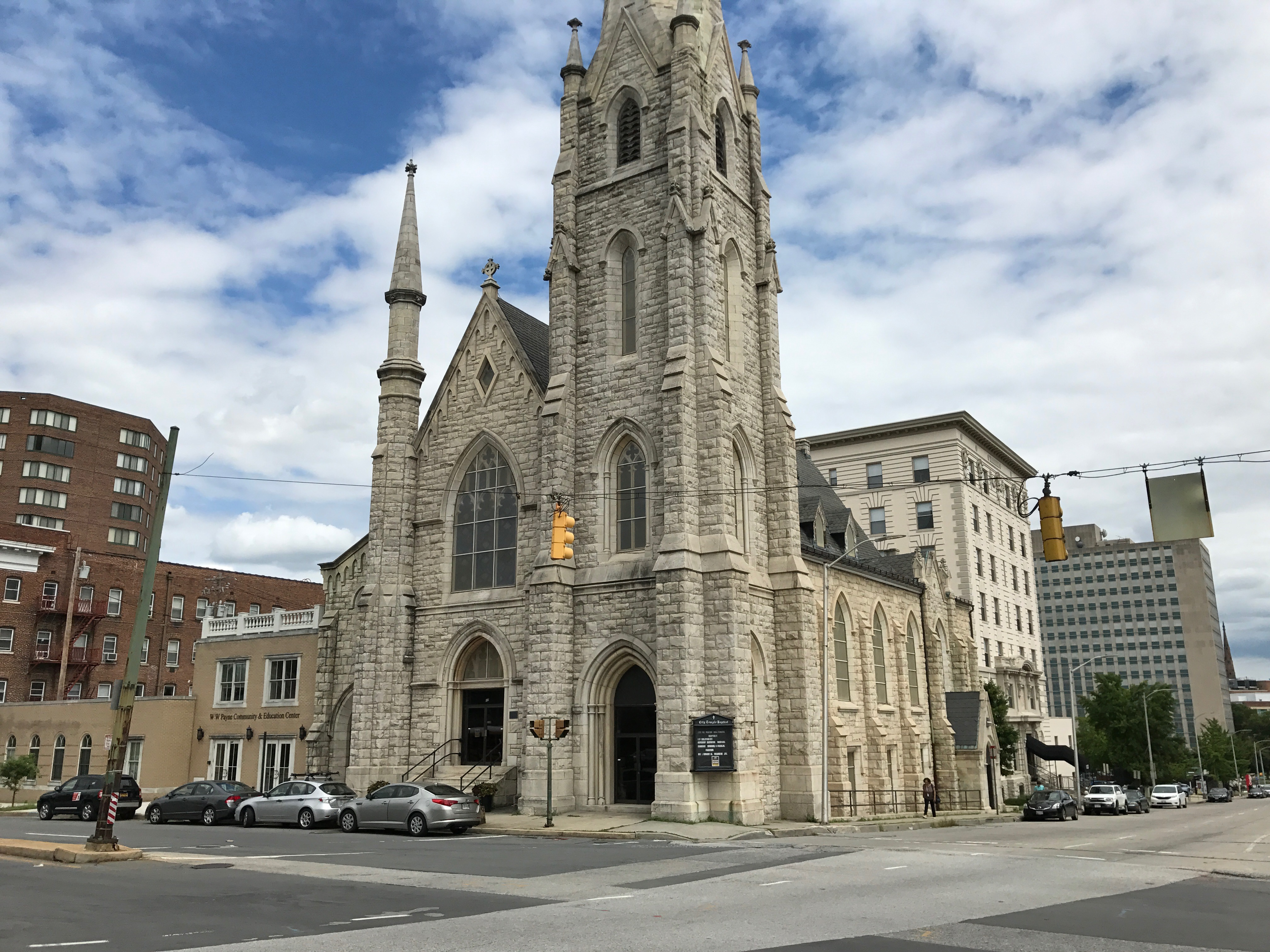
City Temple of Baltimore

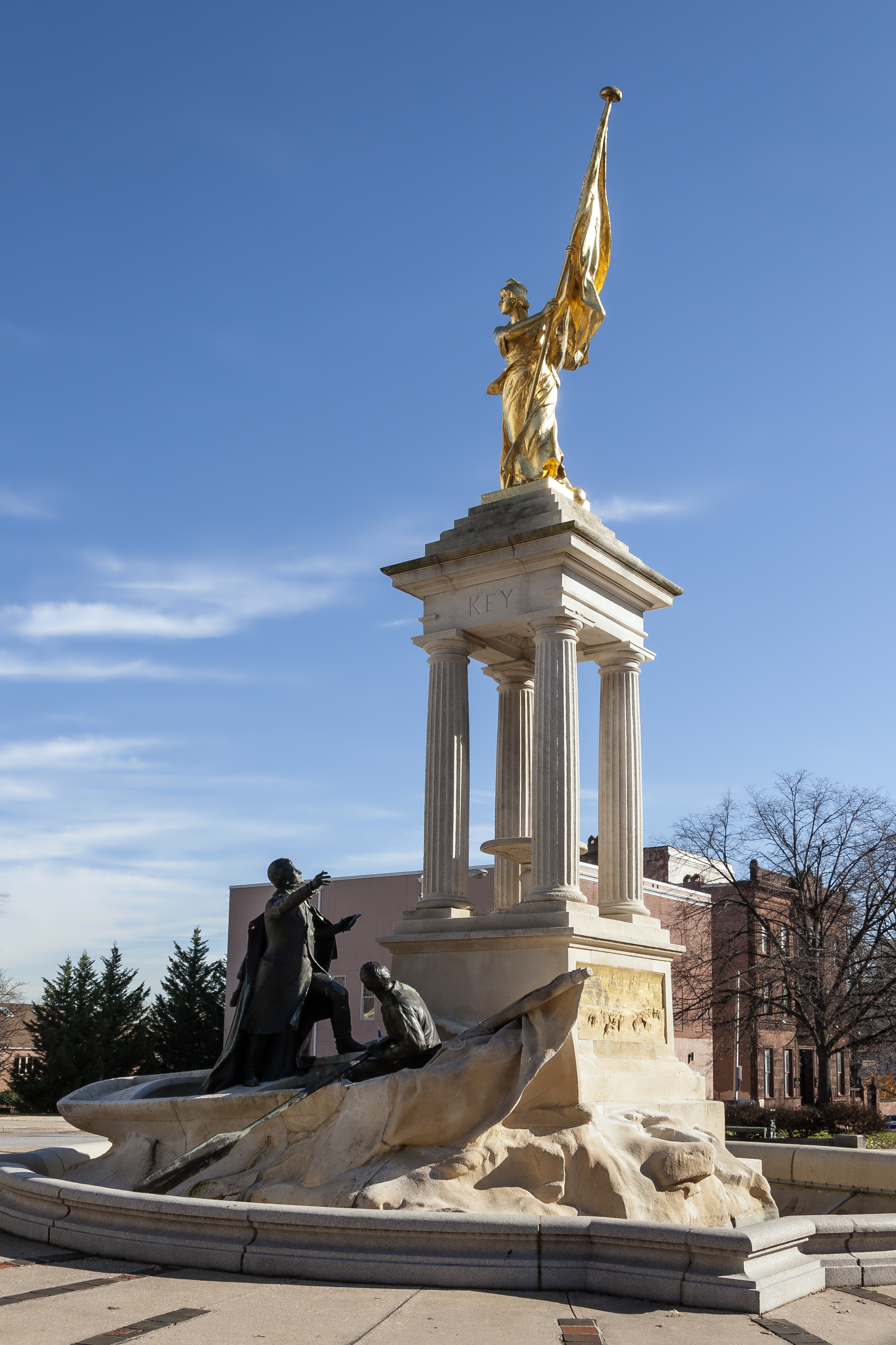
Francis Scott Key Monument

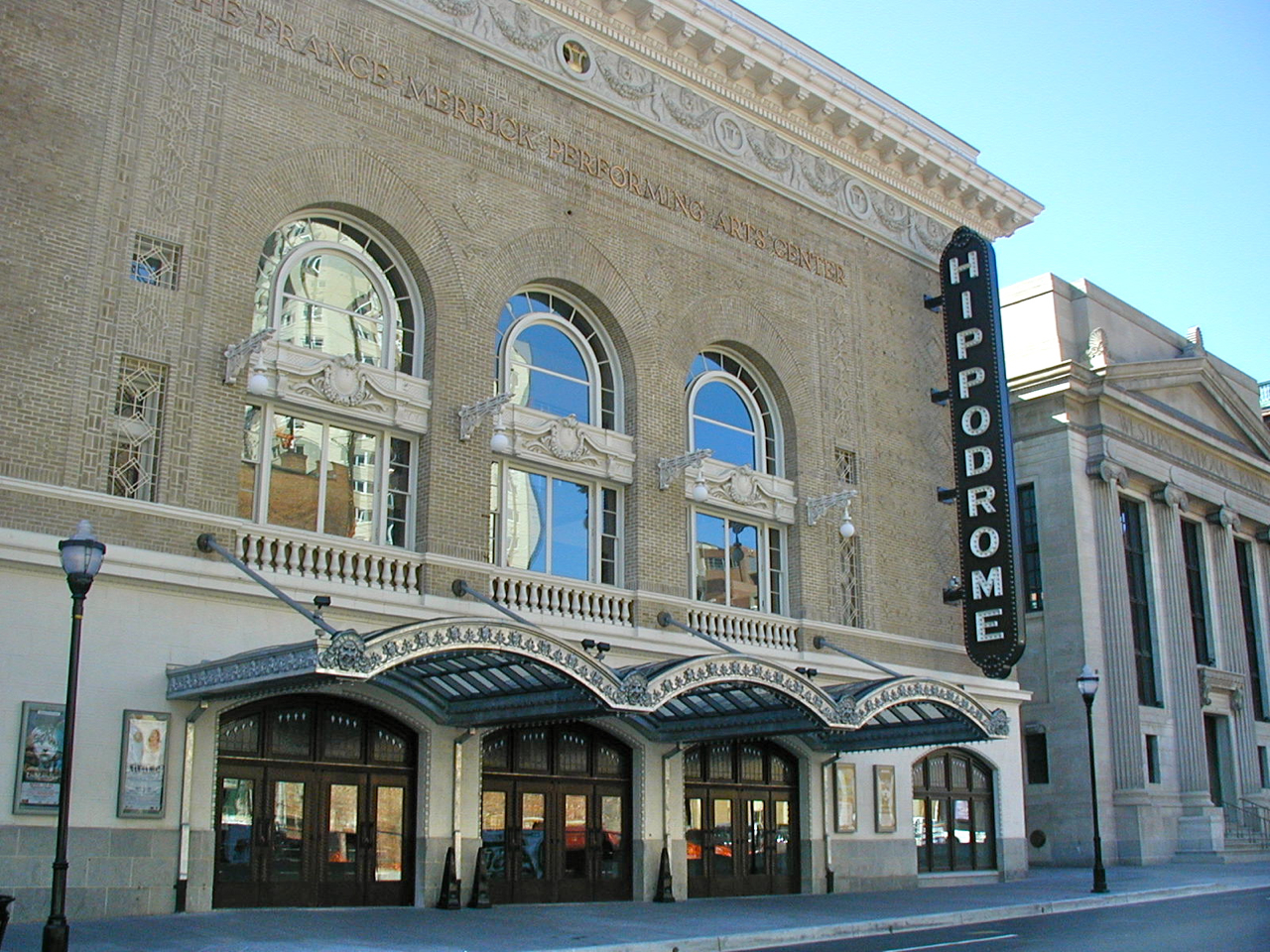
Hippodrome Theatre on Eutaw Street

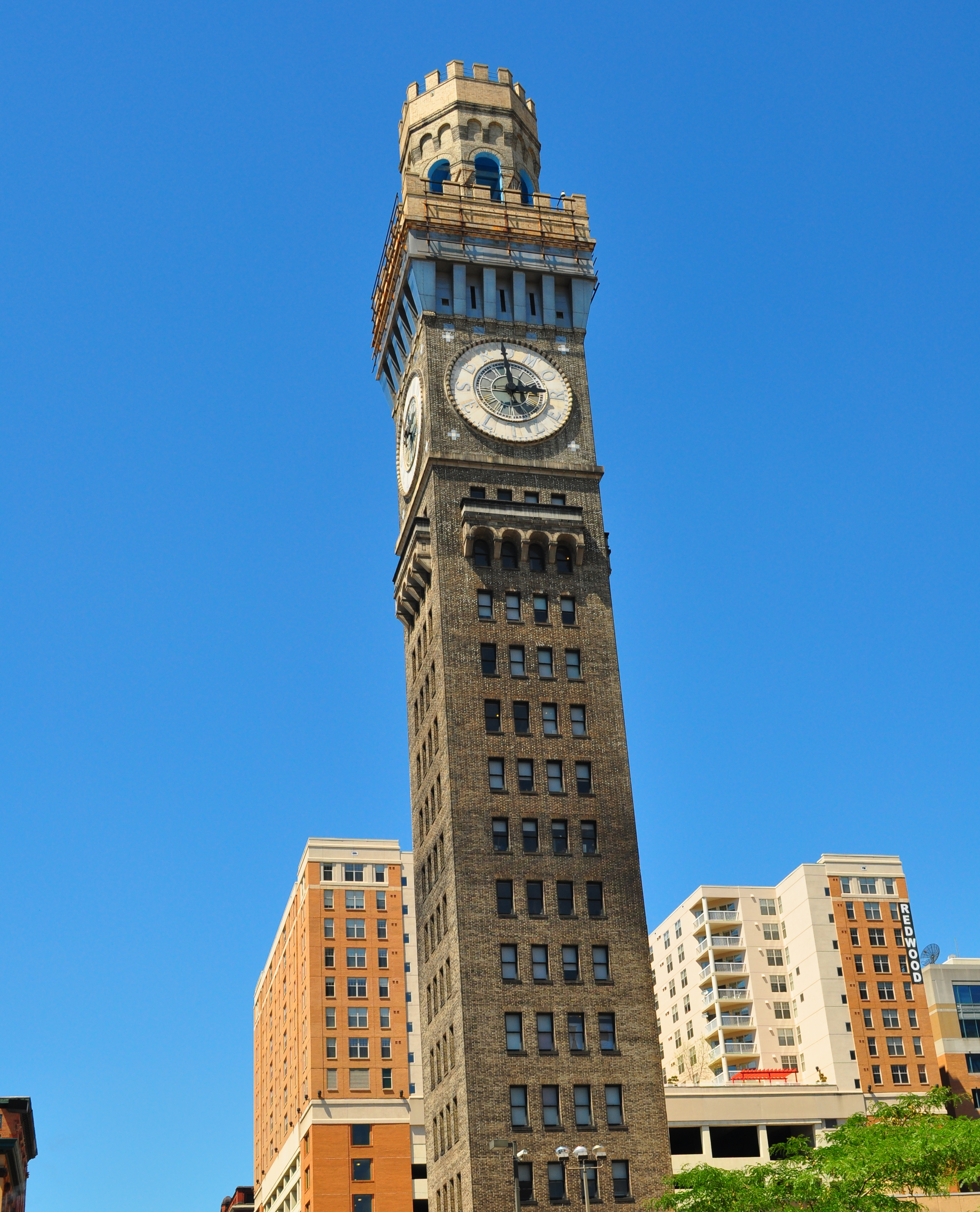
Emerson Bromo-Seltzer Tower on Eutaw Street
