= Gloria Victis (sculpture) =

1874 sculpture by Antonin Mercié

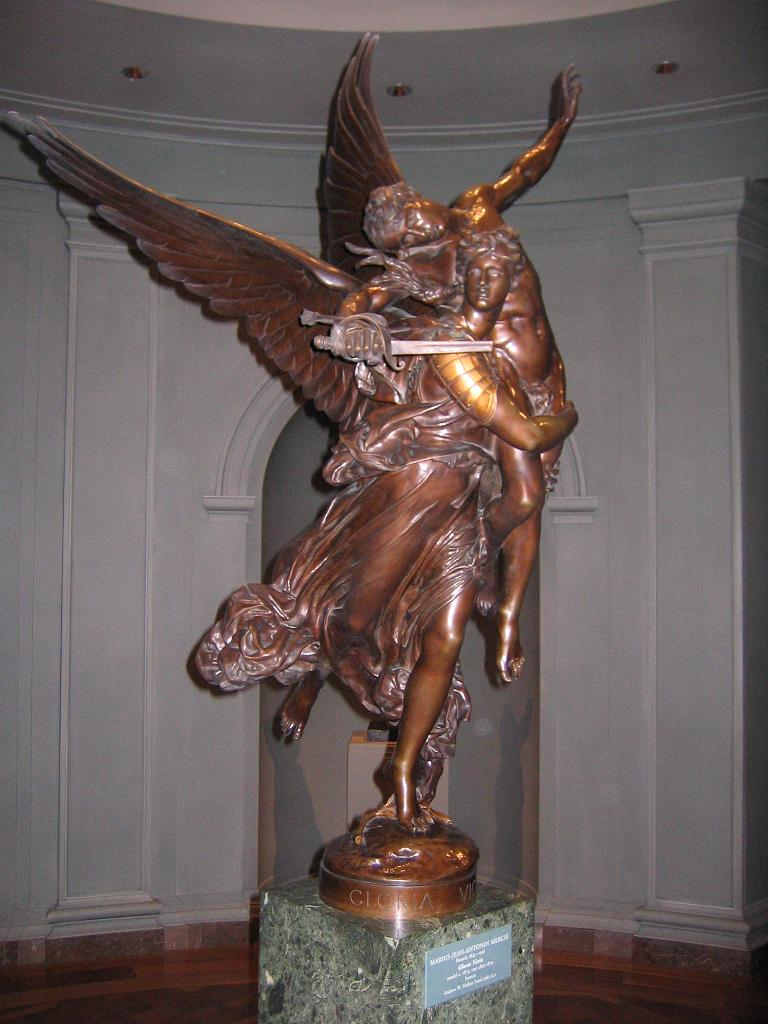
- A casting in Washington, DC
- Artist: Antonin Mercié
- Year: 1874
- Type: Bronze

Gloria Victis ("glory to the vanquished") is a sculpture by Antonin Mercié. Many casts, with different finishes, exist of the group. That pictured here is seen at the National Gallery of Art in Washington DC. Another example of the statue can be found in Bordeaux, France, where it faces Saint André's Cathedral. One is found, for example, at the Ny Carlsberg Glyptotek, Copenhagen, Denmark, where the statue overlooks the museum's Winter Garden. Mercié designed this sculpture following France's defeat in the Franco-Prussian War. He intended to honor those French soldiers who had fallen in the conflict, especially his friend, the artist Henri Regnault (1843–1871). Upon France's defeat, Mercié changed the hero's head from lifted to fallen.

A winged female allegorical image of Fame (or of Hope) carries to glory a dying French hero, his broken sword a sign of defeat. Mercié's original plaster sculpture won a medal at the 1874 Paris Salon. Bronze copies were cast in different sizes by the great foundry of Ferdinand Barbedienne.

According to the University of Clermont-Ferrand, the sculpture's message was "that those defeated were nevertheless cared for and granted immortality". And according to Barton T. Thurber, this work was well received among the French public, who felt humiliated after losing the war.

Despite its acclaim, the work was harshly criticized by fellow French sculptor Jean Baffier for its neoclassical style and for its celebration of a defeat:

"We have been beaten like wheat in a barn, and we shouted: 'Glory to the losers' – And along comes some sort of bastard artist, the pupil of a sexless school, to put up the image of our cowardice."

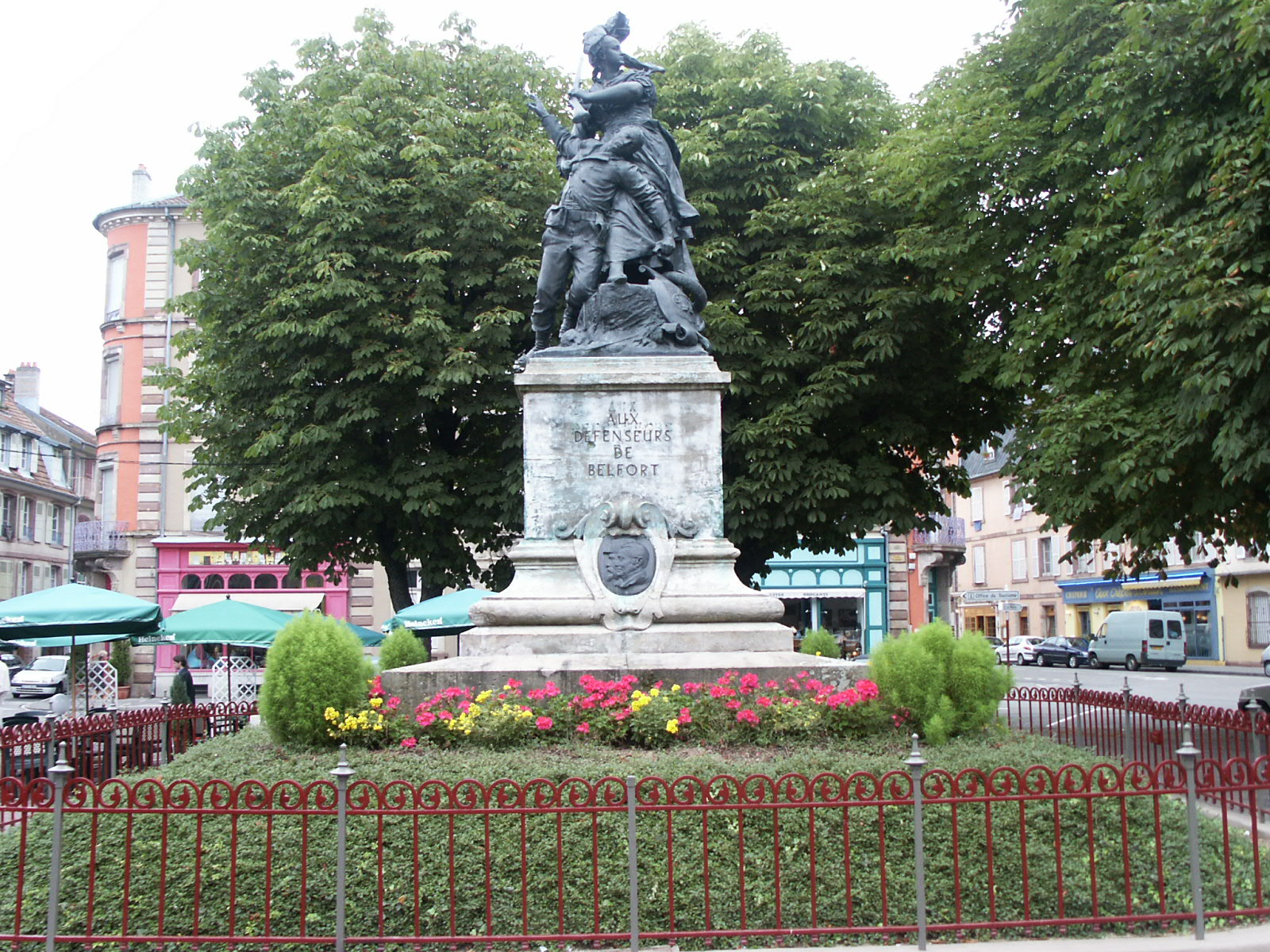
Belfort memorial, a comparable piece by Mercié

Mercié returned to this formula of a female allegorical figure with a soldier in his 1882 Belfort war memorial (nicknamed Quand même, or "Still").

== Casts ==
=== France ===
- Agen, jardin du Lycée Palissy (stolen in September 2008)
- Bordeaux, place Jean-Moulin
- Châlons-en-Champagne, place de la Libération
- Cholet, place de la République
- Niort, place de Strasbourg
- Paris, Petit Palais
- Saint-Denis, Musée d’art et d’histoire

=== Other ===
- Copenhagen, Ny Carlsberg Glyptotek
- Lima

=== Bardedienne ===
A cast of Gloria Victis by Ferdinand Barbedienne in Winston-Salem, North Carolina, dedicated to the victims of the September 11 attacks.

Ferdinand Barbedienne produced several bronze versions in seven different sizes. Examples can be found at:

- Washington DC, National Gallery of Art
- Belfort, France, Musée d'histoire
- Winston-Salem, North Carolina, 110 Oakwood Dr.

== See also ==
- List of works by Antonin Mercié
